= List of Southern Airways Express destinations =

Southern Airways Express serves the following destinations:

City	Airport	IATA Code	Destinations	Notes
Arizona
Phoenix	Phoenix Sky Harbor International Airport	PHX	Imperial	
Arkansas
Harrison (AR)	Boone County Airport (Arkansas)	HRO	Dallas/Fort Worth Memphis	EAS Community
Hot Springs	Memorial Field Airport	HOT	Dallas/Fort Worth Memphis	EAS Community
Jonesboro	Jonesboro Municipal Airport	JBR	St. Louis Nashville	EAS Community
California
Imperial (Service ends October 31, 2026; Advanced Air takes over November 1, 2026.)	Imperial County Airport	IPL	Los Angeles Phoenix	EAS Community
Los Angeles (Service ends October 31, 2026; Advanced Air takes over November 1, 2026.)	Los Angeles International Airport	LAX	Imperial	Hub
Missouri
St. Louis	St. Louis-Lambert International Airport	STL	Jonesboro	
Pennsylvania
Bradford (Contract ends January 31, 2027; SkyWest Airlines awarded new contract)	Bradford Regional Airport	BFD	Pittsburgh Washington-Dulles	EAS Community
DuBois (Contract ends January 31, 2027; Countour Airlines awarded new contract)	DuBois Regional Airport	DUJ	Pittsburgh Washington-Dulles	EAS Community
Pittsburgh (EAS Contract for only destinations, Bradford and Dubois, ends January 31, 2027)	Pittsburgh International Airport	PIT	Bradford DuBois	Hub
Tennessee
Memphis	Memphis International Airport	MEM	El Dorado Harrison (AR) Hot Springs	Hub
Nashville	Nashville International Airport	BNA	Jonesboro	
Texas
Dallas/Ft. Worth	Dallas/Fort Worth International Airport	DFW	El Dorado Harrison (AR) Hot Springs	Hub
Virginia
Washington, DC (EAS Contract for only destinations, Bradford and Dubois, ends January 31, 2027)	Washington Dulles International Airport	IAD	Bradford DuBois	Hub

== Former destinations ==
City	Airport	IATA Code	Destinations	Notes
Alabama
Birmingham	Birmingham–Shuttlesworth International Airport	BHM	Atlanta-Peachtree Destin Gulf Shores Panama City (FL)	
El Dorado	South Arkansas Regional Airport at Goodwin Field	ELD	Dallas/Fort Worth Memphis	No longer served. Contour Aviation took over the Essential Air Service route to Dallas/Fort Worth on March 16, 2026.
Gulf Shores	Jack Edwards Airport	GUF	Birmingham Memphis New Orleans-Lakefront	
Arizona
Show Low	Show Low Regional Airport	SOW	Phoenix	EAS Community | Contract awarded to Contour Airlines due to poor reliability and service
California
Hawthorne (CA)	Hawthorne Municipal Airport (California)	HHR	San Carlos	Branded as Surf Air
Santa Barbara	Santa Barbara Municipal Airport	SBA	San Carlos	Branded as Surf Air
San Carlos	San Carlos Airport (California)	SQL	Hawthorne Santa Barbara Truckee	Branded as Surf Air
Truckee	Truckee Tahoe Airport	TKF	San Carlos	Branded as Surf Air
Colorado
Denver	Denver International Airport	DEN	Chadron Pueblo	
Pueblo	Pueblo Memorial Airport	PUB	Denver	
Florida
Destin	Destin Executive Airport	DSI	Atlanta-Peachtree Birmingham Jackson (MS) Madison Memphis New Orleans-Lakefront Olive Branch (MS) Tampa	
Key West	Key West International Airport	EYW	West Palm Beach	Weekend Service Only
Panama City	Northwest Florida Beaches International Airport	ECP	Atlanta-Peachtree Birmingham Memphis-DeWitt Spain Memphis-Olive Branch New Orleans-Lakefront Oxford (MS)	
Tampa	Tampa International Airport	TPA	Destin West Palm Beach	Weekend Service Only For Destin
West Palm Beach	Palm Beach International Airport	PBI	Key West Tampa	
(Georgia (U.S. state)) Georgia
Atlanta	Hartsfield-Jackson Atlanta International Airport	ATL	Jackson (TN)	Hub
Atlanta-Peachtree	DeKalb-Peachtree Airport	PDK	Destin Memphis	
Iowa
Burlington	Southeast Iowa Regional Airport	BRL	Chicago St. Louis	EAS Community
Illinois
Chicago	O'Hare International Airport	ORD	Burlington West Lafayette Muskegon Quincy	
Indiana
West Lafayette	Purdue University Airport	LAF	Chicago	Subsidized by Purdue University
Louisiana
New Orleans	Lakefront Airport	NEW	Destin Gulf Shore Memphis Oxford (MS) Panama City (FL)	
Maryland
Baltimore	Baltimore/Washington International Airport	BWI	Altoona DuBois Hagerstown Johnstown Lancaster Morgantown	Former Hub
Hagerstown	Hagerstown Regional Airport	HGR	Baltimore Pittsburgh	Former EAS Community | Ended due to falling short of 10 passenger enplanement requirement and exceeding $200 subsidy cap.
Massachusetts
Boston/Norwood	Norwood Memorial Airport	OWD	Nantucket	Ended due to lack of aircraft needed in other regions
Hyannis	Cape Cod Gateway Airport	HYA	Nantucket	Ended due to lack of aircraft needed in other regions
Nantucket	Nantucket Memorial Airport	ACK	Boston/Norwood Hyannis Lancaster New Bedford Providence	Hub | Ended due to lack of aircraft needed in other regions
New Bedford	New Bedford Regional Airport	EWB	Nantucket	Ended due to lack of aircraft needed in other regions
Michigan
Muskegon	Muskegon County Airport	MKG	Chicago	EAS Community | Community requested to terminate contract due to cancellation concerns, contract awarded to Denver Air Connection
Mississippi
Gulfport	Gulfport–Biloxi International Airport	GPT	Oxford	
Madison	Bruce Campbell Field	DXE	Destin Memphis	Service switched to Jackson International Airport
Olive Branch	Olive Branch Airport	OLV	Atlanta-Peachtree Chattanooga Destin Gulf Shores Knoxville Panama City	Switched to Memphis International Airport
Oxford	University-Oxford Airport	UOX	Destin Panama City Jackson Gulfport	
Jackson (MS)	Jackson-Evers International Airport	JAN	Destin Memphis	
Nebraska
Chadron	Chadron Municipal Airport	CDR	Denver	EAS Community
Nevada
Las Vegas	Harry Reid International Airport	LAS	Imperial	
(New York (state)) New York
Jamestown	Chautauqua County-Jamestown Airport	JHW	Pittsburgh	Former EAS Community | Below 10 passenger enplanement requirement and exceeded $200 subsidy cap. Attempting to reestablish EAS service with Boutique Air.
Pennsylvania
Altoona	Altoona–Blair County Airport	AOO	Baltimore Pittsburgh	EAS Community | Boutique Air awarded contract
Franklin	Venango Regional Airport	FKL	Pittsburgh	Former EAS Community | Below 10 passenger enplanement requirement and exceeded $200 subsidy cap.
Harrisburg	Harrisburg International Airport	MDT	Pittsburgh	
Johnstown	Johnstown-Cambria County Airport	JST	Baltimore Pittsburgh	EAS Community | Boutique Air awarded contract
Lancaster	Lancaster Airport (Pennsylvania)	LNS	Pittsburgh Washington-Dulles	EAS Community | SkyWest awarded contract
Wilkes-Barre	Wilkes-Barre/Scranton International Airport	AVP	Pittsburgh	
Rhode Island
Providence	T.F. Green Airport	PVD	Nantucket	
Tennessee
Chattanooga	Chattanooga Metropolitan Airport	CHA	Knoxville Memphis	
Jackson	McKellar-Sipes Regional Airport	MKL	Atlanta St. Louis	
Knoxville	McGhee Tyson Airport	TYS	Chattanooga Memphis	
Memphis	General DeWitt Spain Airport	-	Atlanta-Peachtree Destin Gulf Shores New Orleans Panama City	
Nashville	Nashville International Airport	BNA	Memphis	Ended due to low demand
West Virginia
Morgantown (WV)	Morgantown Municipal Airport	MGW	Pittsburgh Washington-Dulles	EAS Community | Committee recommended SkyWest Airlines for new contract
Guam
Guam	Antonio B. Won Pat International Airport	GUM	Saipan	Branded as Marianas Southern Airways
Northern Mariana Islands
Rota	Rota International Airport	ROP	Saipan	Branded as Marianas Southern Airways
Saipan	Saipan International Airport	SPN	Guam Rota Tinian	Branded as Marianas Southern Airways
Tinian	Tinian International Airport	TIQ	Saipan	Branded as Marianas Southern Airways
