= Go!Express =

Airline brand name

IATA	ICAO	Call sign
-	-	-
- Founded: September 2006
- Commenced operations: April 17, 2007
- Hubs: Honolulu International Airport; Kahului Airport
- Fleet size: 6
- Destinations: 7
- Headquarters: Phoenix, Arizona
- Website: http://www.iflygo.com

Go!Express (marketed as go!Express) was the brand name for the regional airline service of go!, rather than a certificated airline carrier. Mokulele Airlines was the sole operator of Go!Express between April 17, 2007 and March 24, 2009, when their contract was canceled due to Mokulele's partnership with Shuttle America. On the same day, Go! began selling flights operated by Island Air as Go!Express. Rather than using dedicated aircraft on flights sold exclusively as Go!Express, Island Air's Go!Express service was provided by the carrier's existing flights and aircraft.

== History ==
In September 2006, Mesa announced that it had reached an agreement with Mokulele Airlines, whereby Mokulele would operate Cessna Grand Caravan aircraft to Kapalua, Molokai, and Lanai under the Go!Express brand. Service began with flights from Kapalua to Honolulu, Kahului, and Kona on April 17, 2007. Service began for flights to Molokai on July 21, 2007, and flights to Lanai on October 6, 2007. Following Mokulele's agreement with Republic Airways Holdings to have that company operate flights in Hawaii using 70-seat jets, Mesa announced that it will be terminating the Go!Express agreement with Mokuelele in April 2009. The airline later accelerated plans to terminate the agreement with Mokulele, and ended the code-share on March 24, 2009, replacing it with a new agreement with Island Air that allows Mesa to sell existing Island Air flights with the Go!Express name.

With Mesa Air Groups acquisition of Mokulele Airlines, go! resumed codesharing on flights operated by Mokulele, but the Go!Express branding was not adopted.

== Destinations ==
Go!Express operated by Island Air served six inter-island routes as of September 2009.

=== United States ===
- Hawaii
  - Honolulu (Honolulu International Airport)
  - Kahului (Kahului Airport)
  - Kapalua (Kapalua Airport)
  - Kona (Kona International Airport)
  - Lanai (Lanai Airport)
  - Lihue (Lihue Airport)
  - Molokai (Molokai Airport)

Service to Hilo was terminated by Island Air on August 17, 2009, and service between Honolulu and Lihue was discontinued on August 30, 2009.

== Fleet ==
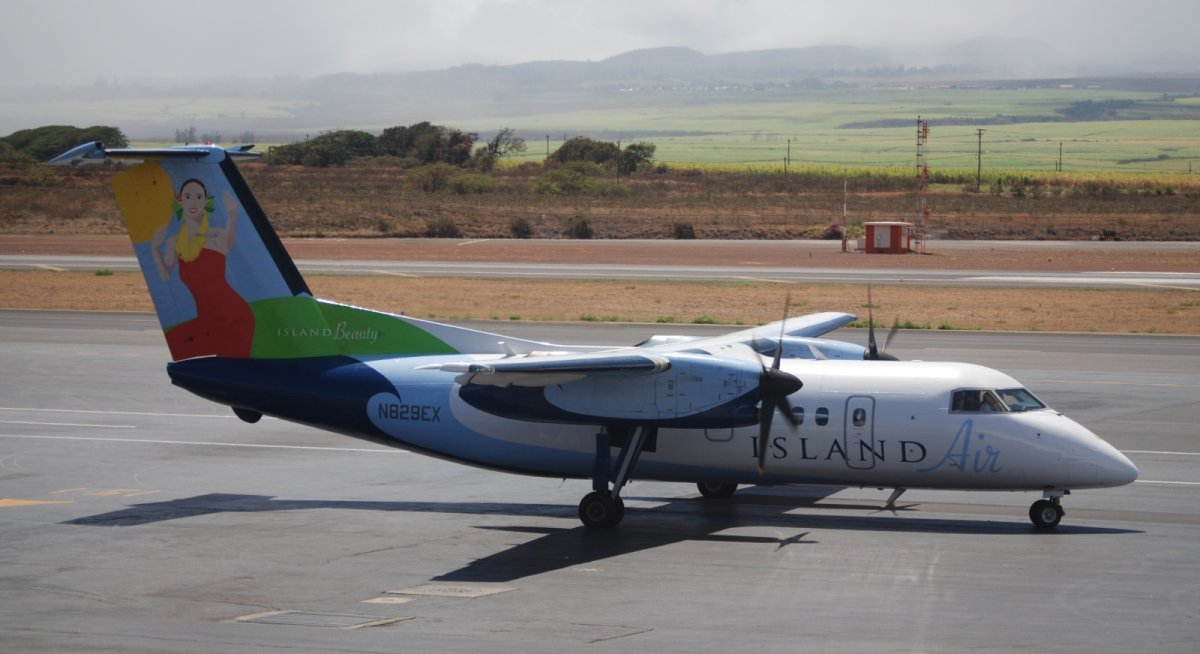
An Island Air Dash 8

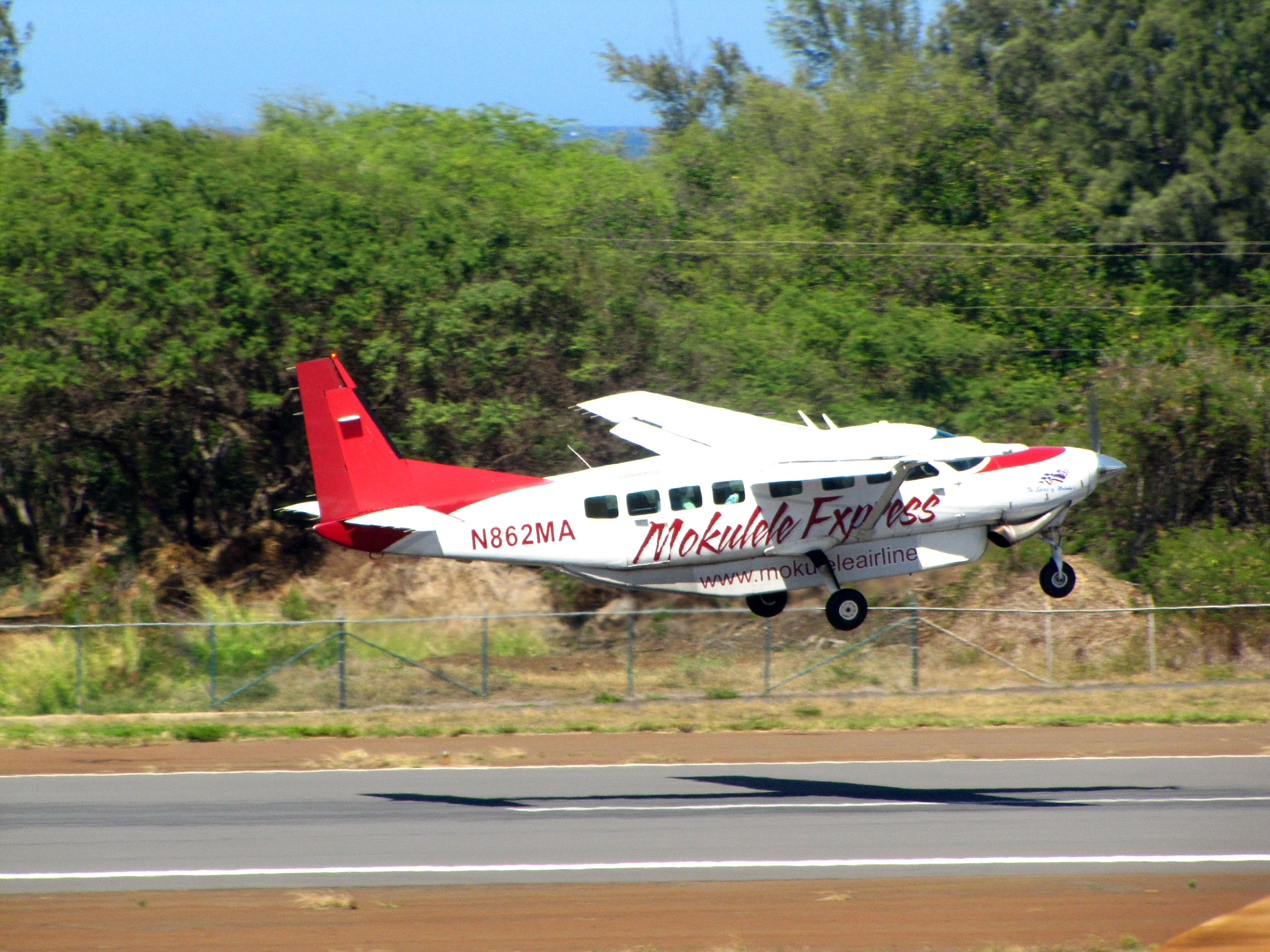
A Mokulele Airlines Grand Caravan

Island Air operated six narrow-body aircraft as of September 2009, with a single economy class service. While operating as Go!Express, Mokulele Airlines operated four aircraft in a single class configuration.

Go!Express Fleet
Aircraft	Total	Orders	Passengers (Economy)	Operated by	Notes
Bombardier Dash 8-100	6		37	Island Air
Cessna Grand Caravan	4		9	Mokulele Airlines

The Dash 8 is a high wing turboprop aircraft providing 37 seats in a two-by-two configuration, only offering window and isle seats, except for the very back row of the aircraft. Seating on Go!Express, like Go!, is first-come first-served, and is not preassigned. Previously, two of Mokulele's Cessna Grand Caravans were completely repainted into Go!Express colors, however since the partnership with Island Air is only a codeshare and not a re-branding of the airline, the Dash 8's operated by Island Air remain in Island Air colors.

== See also ==
- Go! the parent airline of Go!Express
- Mesa Air Group ownership company of Go! and Go!Express
