= Airly =

Australian membership-based private travel provider

- Industry: Aerospace and travel
- Founded: December 2015
- Key people: Ivan Vysotskiy; Alexander Robinson; Luke Hampshire (Co-founders)
- Website: airly.com

Airly is an Australian membership-based private travel provider that was founded in December 2015. Airly's 'JetShare' service allows for booking of private jet flights.

== Business model ==
In order to reduce on-ground delays, Airly operates out of less congested airports. The JetShare app allows for flight and seat availability to be accessed at a varying amount of time prior to the flight, depending on the operator.

Airly's original business model was based on that of Surf Air (an American company based in California), however with some modifications. It was meant to target frequent fliers and corporate travelers, who could buy an all-you-can-fly subscription for an initial joining cost of $1000 and a payment of $2550 per month for the cheapest membership option. Airly claimed that by using less busy airports and flying a Learjet 45, it would save its members nearly two hours per round trip CBD-to-CBD flying Sydney to Melbourne in comparison to commercial airlines. Airly has not put this model to practice.
