= KTRK =

KTRK may refer to:

- Kyrgyz Television, public broadcasting company of the Kyrgyz Republic
- KTRK-TV, a digital VHF television station (channel 13) licensed to Houston, Texas, United States
- The ICAO airport code for Truckee-Tahoe Airport in Truckee, California, United States
- A radio station in the video game Vampire: The Masquerade – Bloodlines
