= Go! (airline) =

US regional airline

IATA	ICAO	Call sign
YV	ASH	AIR SHUTTLE
- Founded: 2005; 21 years ago
- Ceased operations: April 1, 2014; 12 years ago
- Hubs: Honolulu International Airport
- Frequent-flyer program: Go! Miles
- Subsidiaries: Go!Express
- Fleet size: 2
- Destinations: 6
- Parent company: Mesa Air Group
- Headquarters: Phoenix, Arizona
- Key people: Jonathan G. Ornstein (CEO); Christopher Pappaioanou (President)
- Website: www.iflygo.com

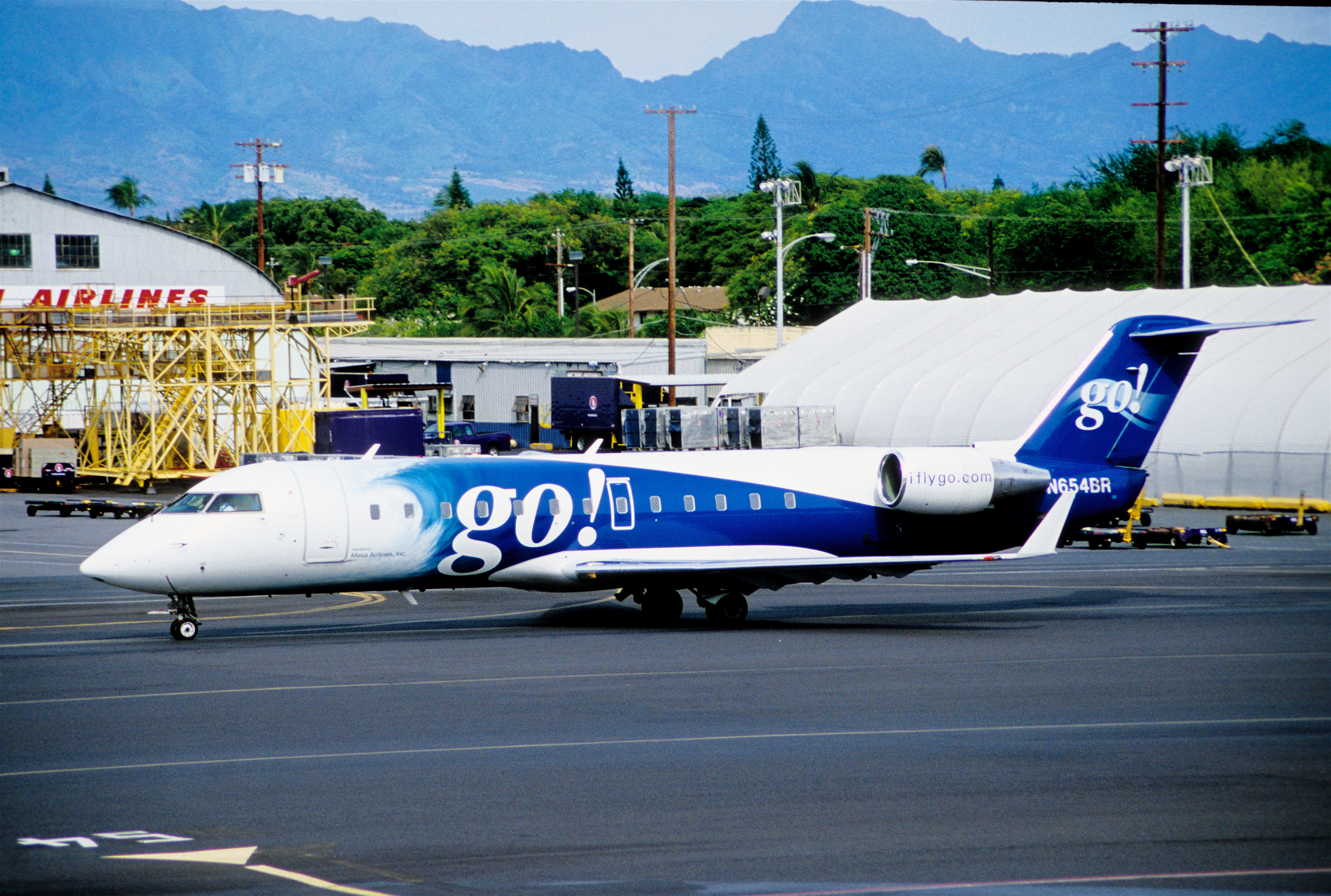
A CRJ-200 showing Go!'s original livery

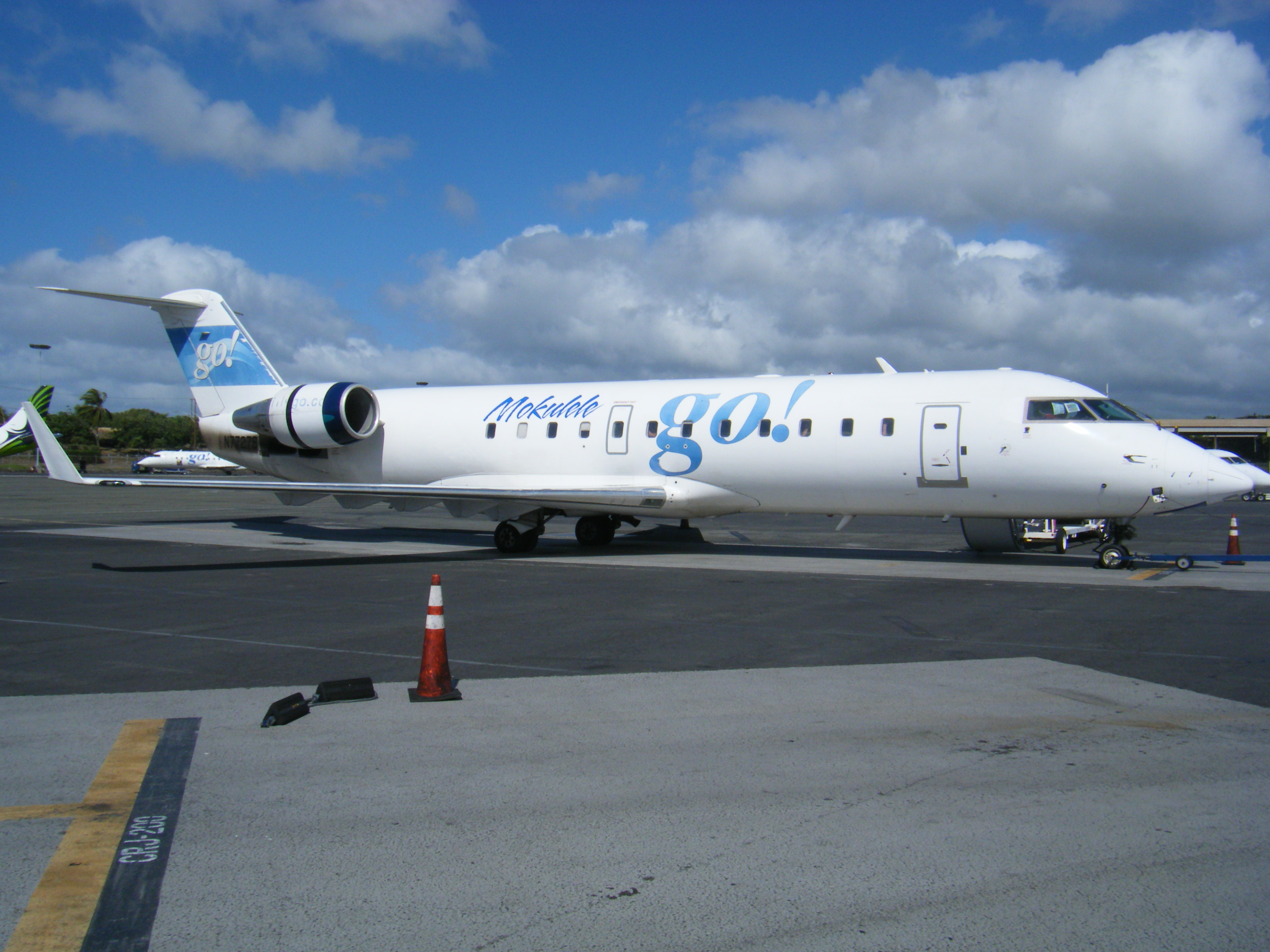
go! Mokulele CRJ-200 at Honolulu International Airport

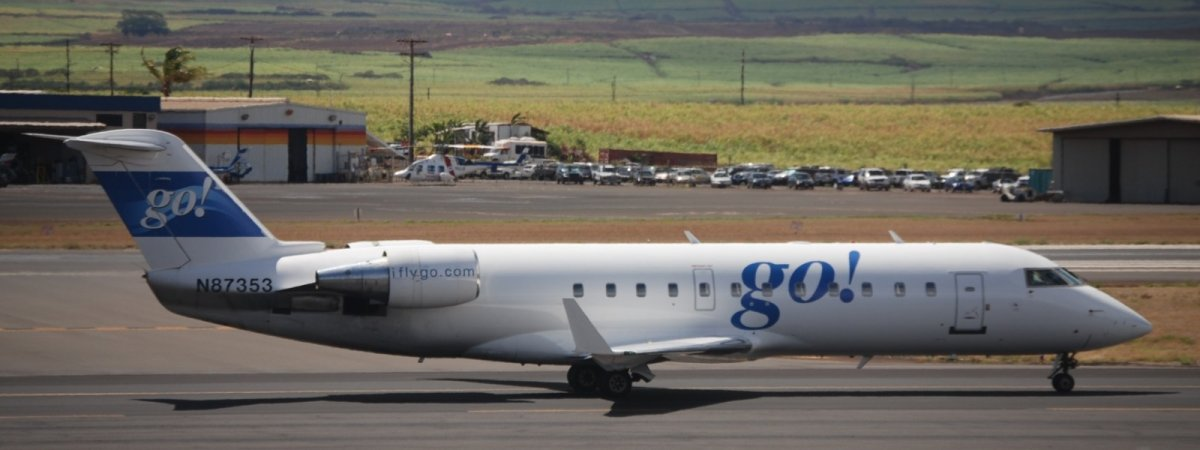
A CRJ-200 showing Go!'s simplified livery

Go! (styled as go!) was a regional brand of Arizona-based Mesa Airlines. Go! operated inter-island services within Hawaii. Its main base was Honolulu International Airport. It was a division within the Mesa Airlines subsidiary of Mesa Air Group and its flights were operated by Mesa Airlines. The airline ceased operations in Hawaii on April 1, 2014. The company slogan was Hawaii's Low Fare Airline.

== History ==
Regional carrier Mesa Airlines started Go!'s inter-island operations on June 9, 2006, using five Bombardier CRJ-200 regional jet aircraft.

In September 2006, the airline announced that it had reached an agreement with Mokulele Airlines, whereby Mokulele would operate Cessna Grand Caravan aircraft to Kapalua, Molokai, and Lanai under the name Go!Express. Service began with flights from Kapalua to Honolulu, Kahului, and Kona on April 17, 2007. Service began for flights to Molokai on July 21, 2007 and flights to Lanai on October 6, 2007. Following Mokulele's agreement with Republic Airways Holdings to have that company operate flights in Hawaii using 70-seat jets, Mesa announced that it would be terminating the Go!Express agreement with Mokulele in April 2009. The airline later accelerated plans to terminate the agreement with Mokulele, and ended the code-share on March 24, 2009, replacing it with a new agreement with Island Air that allowed Mesa to sell existing Island Air flights with the Go!Express name.

On March 17, 2014, Mesa announced that Go! would cease service on April 1, 2014, with its aircraft re-deployed to support Mesa's operations on the U.S. mainland. The airline also stated that a long term increase in the cost of fuel had prevented the operation from being profitable.

=== Lawsuits over formation ===
In February 2006, before the airline had started flying, Hawaiian Airlines filed a complaint for injunctive relief. In its complaint, Hawaiian Airlines noted that Mesa Air Group had been a potential investor during Hawaiian's Chapter 11 bankruptcy proceedings and as such, had access to confidential business data that it alleged Mesa then used in developing Go!. Hawaiian claimed that the confidentiality agreement under which potential investors were given access to the data prohibited the use of that information to compete with Hawaiian for a period of two years.

In a memo explaining his decision to rule against Hawaiian's request for a preliminary injunction, U.S. Bankruptcy Judge Robert Faris wrote that e-mail made public during Hawaiian Airlines lawsuit raised "real doubts about the propriety of Mesa's conduct."

In March 2006, Mesa filed a counter suit, claiming that Hawaiian was violating antitrust law by trying to keep Mesa out of Hawaii, using legal maneuvers to prevent Mesa from offering fares below the prevailing fares offered by Hawaiian. Mesa also alleged that Hawaiian had coerced two freight forwarders into refusing parts and equipment Mesa wanted to ship to Hawaii for the new airline. Faris dismissed the counter suit on December 8, 2006, and at that time set an opening trial date on September 25, 2007.

In October 2006, Aloha Airlines parent Aloha Airgroup filed a lawsuit similar to Hawaiian's, claiming that Mesa received confidential information during Aloha's Chapter 11 bankruptcy proceedings and improperly used it to enter the Hawaii inter-island market with the intent of driving Aloha out of business.

On March 20, 2008, Aloha Airlines filed for Chapter 11 bankruptcy protection. Citing record high fuel prices and inter-island competition with Go!, it ceased passenger operation 11 days later.

As the trial date approached, it became known that Mesa's chief financial officer, George "Peter" Murnane III, had e-mailed an acquaintance about a week after Hawaiian filed suit, first asking for information about how to delete files in such a way that they could not be discovered, then confirming that the files in question were deleted. Mesa placed Murnane on paid administrative leave on September 22, 2007. Hawaiian contended that Murnane deleted the files maliciously in an attempt to destroy evidence that would show that Mesa improperly used confidential data. Mesa contended that Murnane accidentally deleted the files in question in an attempt to remove pornographic material from his computer.

On September 27, in a pretrial hearing, Faris preliminarily ruled that Mesa had misused confidential information in setting up Go!, and failed to return or destroy confidential data acquired during the bankruptcy proceedings. "The misuse was a substantial factor in Mesa's decision on entering the Hawaii market," said Faris. Faris, however, deferred any decision on damages pending the outcome of the trial, saying it still needed to be decided whether the information existed in the public domain. Following the hearing which lasted from September 28 to October 4, Faris ruled on October 30 that Mesa had misused the confidential information and ordered Mesa to pay Hawaiian $80 million, while rejecting Hawaiian's request to bar Go! from selling tickets for one year. Following the ruling, Mesa requested a retrial claiming it had recovered the previously lost evidence on a third hard drive. On December 13, Faris denied the request on the basis that new evidence would likely not change the outcome of the trial, and the airline planned to proceed with its appeal of the decision to US District Court. On April 30, 2008, the two airlines announced a settlement had been reached whereby Mesa would withdraw its appeal of the judgment and would pay Hawaiian $52.5 million.

=== Attempted Name Change to Aloha ===
On November 28, 2008, Go!'s parent company, Mesa Air Group, announced that it had reached an agreement with Yucaipa Cos., the former majority holder of Aloha Airlines, to settle Aloha's lawsuit. Among the terms of the agreement was that Yucaipa would license the Aloha Airlines name to Mesa, which would rebrand the Go! operation as Aloha Airlines. While Yucaipa was the successful high bidder for the rights to Aloha's name, bankruptcy judge Lloyd King temporarily blocked the deal and postponed a hearing on the deal until February 19, in order to give supporters and opponents time to respond. On March 3, 2009, bankruptcy judge Lloyd King blocked the sale of Aloha's name and brand on the grounds that the auction was not public and must be reheld. On May 14, 2009, he blocked Mesa from rebranding Go! as Aloha.

=== Name change to Go! Mokulele ===
In October 2009, Mesa Air Group and Republic Airways Holdings merged their competing subsidiaries, Go! and Mokulele Airlines, into a joint venture, go! Mokulele. Mesa's CRJ-200 aircraft continued to operate jet service, supplemented by Mokulele's Cessna 208 Grand Caravan turboprop aircraft. Embraer 170 aircraft, operated on behalf of Mokulele by Republic subsidiary Shuttle America, were removed from Hawaii service. Mesa maintained a 75% stake in the joint venture, with Republic holding the remaining 25%. Mokulele aircraft remained on the Mokulele operating certificate, while the go! Mokulele aircraft remained on the Mesa Airlines operating certificate.

During the concluding months of 2011 it was announced the complete divestiture of the Mokulele Airlines turboprop operations from Mesa Air Group's joint venture with Republic Airways Holdings. In June 2012, Mesa began the process of dropping the "go! Mokulele" name and reverting to "go!".

=== 2008 incident and investigation ===
The Federal Aviation Administration opened an investigation into whether two Go! pilots fell asleep during a 36-minute flight between Honolulu and Hilo. Flight 1002 on February 13, 2008, overshot Hilo Airport by 30 miles (26 nmi; 48 km), remaining 21,000 feet (6,401 m) in the air as it missed the destination. Air traffic controllers were unable to reach the two pilots for 25 minutes, after which contact was re-established and the aircraft returned for a safe landing in Hilo. The pilots were later fired over the incident. On September 24, 2008 the FAA announced that the licenses of both pilots had been suspended. The Captain had his suspended for 60 days, while the First Officer had his suspended for 45 days. No action was taken against Go! because sufficient rest was provided for both crew members prior to the flight. During the investigations, however, it was found that the Captain in fact suffered from a sleep disorder known as severe obstructive sleep apnea. This is a condition that causes a person to stop breathing intermittently during sleep, thus preventing a full night's rest.

== Destinations ==
Mesa Airlines operated flights on behalf of Go! to the following destinations:

=== United States ===
- Hawaii
  - Hilo (Hilo International Airport)
  - Honolulu (Honolulu International Airport) Hub
  - Kahului (Kahului Airport)
  - Kona (Kona International Airport)
  - Lihue (Lihue Airport)

== Fleet ==
As of October 2012, the Go! fleet consisted of the following aircraft.

Go! Airlines fleet
Aircraft	Total	Passengers	Routes
Bombardier CRJ200	2	50	Commuter

As of October 2012, Go!'s average fleet age was 13.2 years.

The airline had delayed plans to order eight to twelve larger aircraft, either the Bombardier CRJ900 or Embraer 195, to replace the CRJ200s.

== Go! Miles ==
Each flight on Go! earned 500 miles in the airline's Go! Miles program. Upon accruing 5,000 miles, the participant was awarded one one-way segment on Go!.

== Incidents and accidents ==
- Go! Flight 1002 missed its airport and flew beyond for 15 minutes (26 nautical miles [30 mi; 48 km]) after its pilots fell asleep in the cockpit, on February 13, 2008. The Canadair CRJ-200 (tail number N651BR) was flying from Honolulu to Hilo in Hawaii.

== See also ==
- List of defunct airlines of the United States
