= SQL (disambiguation) =

SQL (short for Structured Query Language) is a domain-specific language used in programming and designed for managing data held in a relational databases.

SQL may also refer to:

- Standard quantum limit, a limit on measurement accuracy at quantum scales in physics
- Squelch, in telecommunications, a circuit function that acts to suppress the audio (or video) output of a receiver in the absence of a strong input signal
- San Carlos Airport (California), an airport in San Mateo County, California, whose IATA designation and FAA LID are SQL
