= Truckee Tahoe Airport =

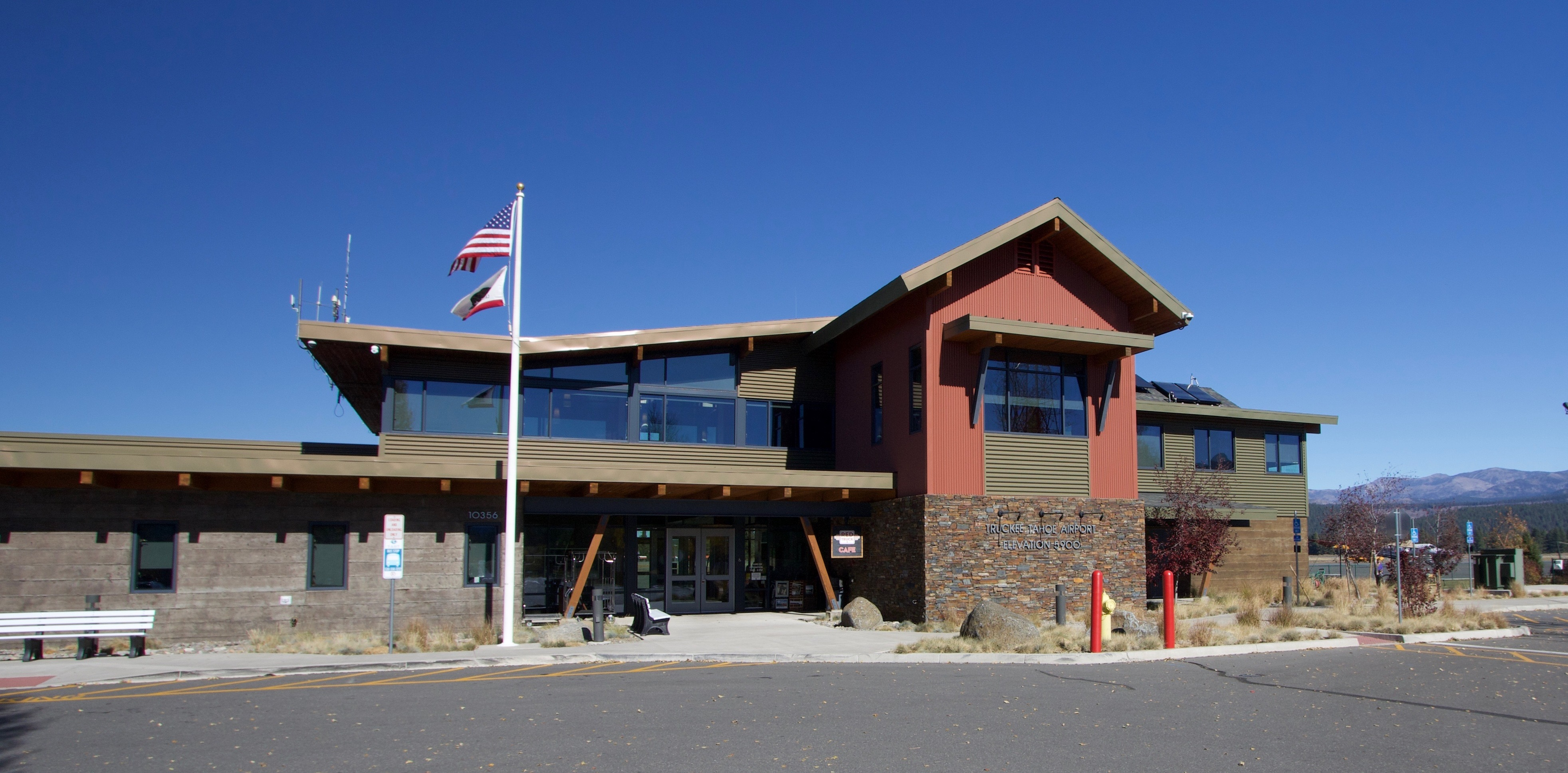
- Main airport building in 2018
- IATA: TKF; ICAO: KTRK; FAA LID: TRK

Summary
- Airport type: Public
- Owner: Truckee Tahoe Airport District
- Serves: Truckee, California
- Elevation AMSL: 5,904 ft (1,800 m)
- Coordinates: 39°19′12″N 120°08′22″W
- Website: truckeetahoeairport.com
- Interactive map of Truckee Tahoe Airport

Runways
Direction	Length		Surface
Direction	ft	m	Surface
11/29	7,001	2,134	Asphalt
2/20	4,654	1,419	Asphalt

Statistics (2017)
- Aircraft operations: 35,000
- Based aircraft: 114
- Sources: airport website and FAA

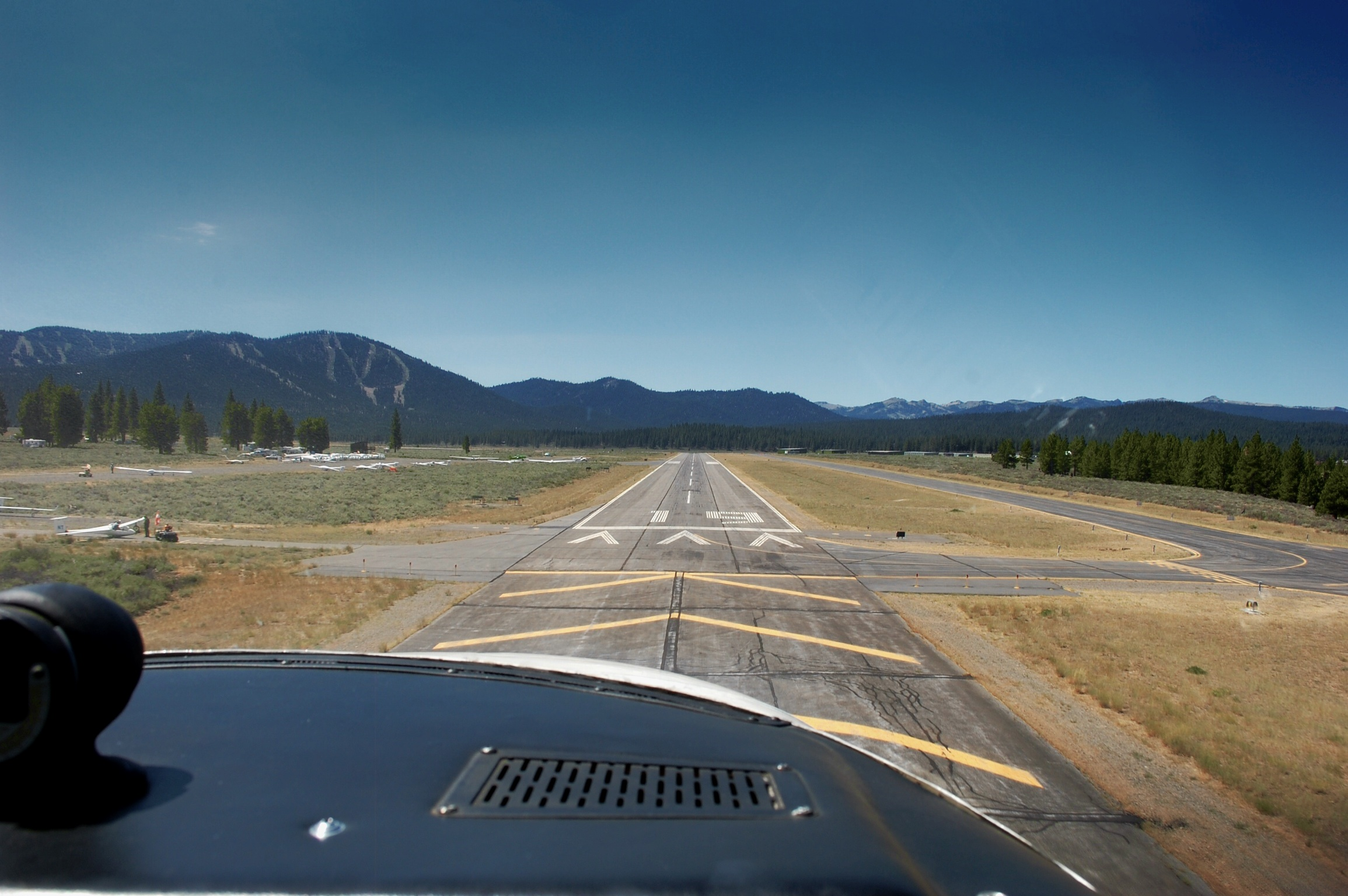
A Beechcraft Baron landing on runway 19, 2012 (now runway 20)

Truckee Tahoe Airport (IATA: TKF, ICAO: KTRK, FAA LID: TRK) is a public airport two miles east of Truckee, California, United States. The airport is in both Nevada County and Placer County. It is owned by Truckee Tahoe Airport District, a bi-county special district. The FAA's National Plan of Integrated Airport Systems for 2009–2013 called it a general aviation airport.

Many U.S. airports use the same three-letter location identifier for the FAA and IATA, but Truckee Tahoe Airport is TRK to the FAA and TKF to IATA. (IATA lists TRK as Juwata Airport in Tarakan, North Kalimantan, Indonesia.)

== Facilities ==
Truckee-Tahoe Airport covers 2,280 acres (920 ha) at an elevation of 5,904 ft (1,800 m). It has two asphalt runways: 11/29 is 7,001 by 100 ft (2,134 by 30 m) and 2/20 is 4,654 by 75 ft (1,419 by 23 m).

A seasonal control tower opened June 1, 2017 and operated through September 15. The tower reopened in December of 2017 as a year round tower. The tower opens daily at 0700L. Closing times change depending on the season.

In 2016 the District reported 32,524 aircraft operations.

In the year ending December 31, 2017 the airport had 35,000 aircraft operations, average 95 per day: 97% general aviation, 3% air taxi, and less than 1% military. 114 aircraft were then based at this airport: 98 single-engine, 7 multi-engine, 1 jet, 3 helicopters, 4 glider and 1 ultralight.

While the airport does not offer any commercial service, such service is available from Reno-Tahoe International Airport.

Runway elevation is 5,900 ft (1,800 m), pattern altitude is 7,000 ft (2,100 m). Both runways are lighted. Density altitude can exceed 9,000 ft (2,700 m) in summer months. Downdrafts can occur on final to RWY 20. Glider pilots use left traffic RWY 20. Powered aircraft use right traffic RWY 20.

100LL and Jet A are available 7am - 7pm, and self serve 100LL is available 7am - 9pm. There are 210 paved tie-downs for transient parking, no landing fees and low overnight tie-down fees.

The airport is attended seven days a week, 7am - 9pm. Snow removal equipment is operated round-the-clock as needed. Pre-heating services and aircraft maintenance are offered by local FBOs. No de-icing services are available.

The airport had a 500-gallon underground heating oil tank removed in 1986. Small amounts of oil that had leaked were monitored and removed; six remaining above-ground tanks were functioning satisfactorily and are regularly tested.

== Airlines and destinations ==
Airlines	Destinations	Refs
Southern Airways Express	San Carlos	

== Accidents and incidents ==
- On December 28, 2005, a Learjet 35A jet stalled during a circling approach to the airport. Both pilots were killed.
- On June 15, 2021, a Cirrus SR20 aircraft with two occupants crashed into Martis Valley shortly after departing from the airport. One occupant was killed, while the other sustained injuries.
- On July 26, 2021, a Bombardier Challenger 600 business jet, registered N605TR, crashed while on approach to the airport, in a wooded area near Ponderosa Golf Course. All six occupants on board were killed.
- On March 30, 2024, a Socata TBM700N (TBM960) single-engine turboprop business and utility light aircraft crashed during a missed approach procedure to the airport. The aircraft crashed one mile north of the airport. Two occupants on board were killed.

== Climate ==
Climate data for Truckee-Tahoe Airport, California, 1991–2020 normals: 5900ft (1798m)
Month	Jan	Feb	Mar	Apr	May	Jun	Jul	Aug	Sep	Oct	Nov	Dec	Year
Record high °F (°C)	65 (18)	71 (22)	74 (23)	79 (26)	88 (31)	94 (34)	99 (37)	98 (37)	96 (36)	86 (30)	75 (24)	63 (17)	99 (37)
Mean maximum °F (°C)	56.7 (13.7)	60.4 (15.8)	65.4 (18.6)	73.3 (22.9)	79.3 (26.3)	90.0 (32.2)	94.0 (34.4)	93.5 (34.2)	89.7 (32.1)	79.7 (26.5)	70.7 (21.5)	56.5 (13.6)	95.0 (35.0)
Mean daily maximum °F (°C)	42.4 (5.8)	43.9 (6.6)	48.9 (9.4)	55.6 (13.1)	64.8 (18.2)	75.5 (24.2)	84.8 (29.3)	83.9 (28.8)	77.5 (25.3)	64.8 (18.2)	51.7 (10.9)	41.3 (5.2)	61.3 (16.3)
Daily mean °F (°C)	27.9 (−2.3)	29.0 (−1.7)	33.7 (0.9)	38.8 (3.8)	47.1 (8.4)	55.6 (13.1)	62.5 (16.9)	60.5 (15.8)	55.0 (12.8)	45.0 (7.2)	34.7 (1.5)	27.6 (−2.4)	43.1 (6.2)
Mean daily minimum °F (°C)	13.4 (−10.3)	14.1 (−9.9)	18.6 (−7.4)	21.9 (−5.6)	29.4 (−1.4)	35.8 (2.1)	40.3 (4.6)	37.2 (2.9)	32.4 (0.2)	25.1 (−3.8)	17.8 (−7.9)	13.9 (−10.1)	25.0 (−3.9)
Mean minimum °F (°C)	−2.9 (−19.4)	−1.1 (−18.4)	4.8 (−15.1)	11.2 (−11.6)	19.7 (−6.8)	24.8 (−4.0)	31.7 (−0.2)	30.1 (−1.1)	24.5 (−4.2)	14.3 (−9.8)	2.2 (−16.6)	−4.8 (−20.4)	−9.7 (−23.2)
Record low °F (°C)	−22 (−30)	−12 (−24)	−8 (−22)	6 (−14)	14 (−10)	21 (−6)	23 (−5)	23 (−5)	18 (−8)	4 (−16)	−13 (−25)	−22 (−30)	−22 (−30)
Average precipitation inches (mm)	4.94 (125)	4.82 (122)	4.19 (106)	1.85 (47)	1.80 (46)	0.73 (19)	0.47 (12)	0.47 (12)	0.56 (14)	1.66 (42)	2.52 (64)	5.14 (131)	29.15 (740)
Average snowfall inches (cm)	20.6 (52)	24.8 (63)	25.5 (65)	5.9 (15)	1.7 (4.3)	0.0 (0.0)	0.0 (0.0)	0.0 (0.0)	0.2 (0.51)	1.9 (4.8)	12.9 (33)	15.7 (40)	109.2 (277.61)
Source 1: NOAA
Source 2: XMACIS2 (snowfall, records & monthly max/mins)
