= Mokulele Airlines =

Airline of the United States

IATA	ICAO	Call sign
None	MHO	MAHALO
- Founded: 1994 as Mokulele Flight Service
- AOC #: 141A246O
- Hubs: Kahului; Honolulu
- Destinations: 9
- Parent company: Surf Air Mobility
- Headquarters: Kahului, Hawaii
- Key people: Deanna White (CEO of Surf Air Mobility); Louis Saint-Cyr (President of Hawaii Operations)
- Founder: Rebecca Inaba
- Employees: 235
- Website: mokuleleairlines.com

Mokulele Airlines is a regional airline operating in Hawaii. The airline operates scheduled inter-island and charter flights, primarily between smaller airports and its hubs at Kahului Airport on the island of Maui and Daniel K. Inouye International Airport in Honolulu on the island of Oahu. The airline was acquired by Southern Airways Express in 2019 but continues to operate under its own brand. Both Southern Airways and Mokulele Airlines are subsidiaries of Surf Air Mobility, which purchased Southern in 2023.

Mokulele is the Hawaiian language word for aircraft, which was made by combining the words moku meaning island and lele meaning leap or hop, which also reflects the island hopper service offered by the company.

== History ==
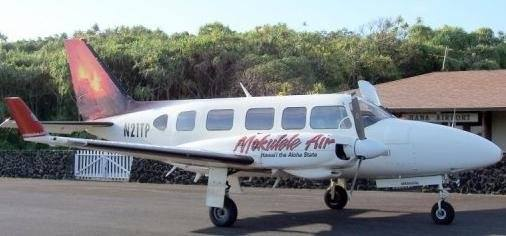
Mokulele flew Piper Navajo Chieftains for years, with Hawai'i scenes branding each of the 3 aircraft it once flew.

=== Mokulele Flight Service and Mokulele Airlines ===
The airline was founded in 1994 as Mokulele Flight Service by Rebecca "Kawehi" Inaba and was the first airline in Hawaii to be founded by a Native Hawaiian woman. Mokulele is the Hawaiian word for “flying ship” but has come to represent not only airplanes but aviation and airlines more generally.

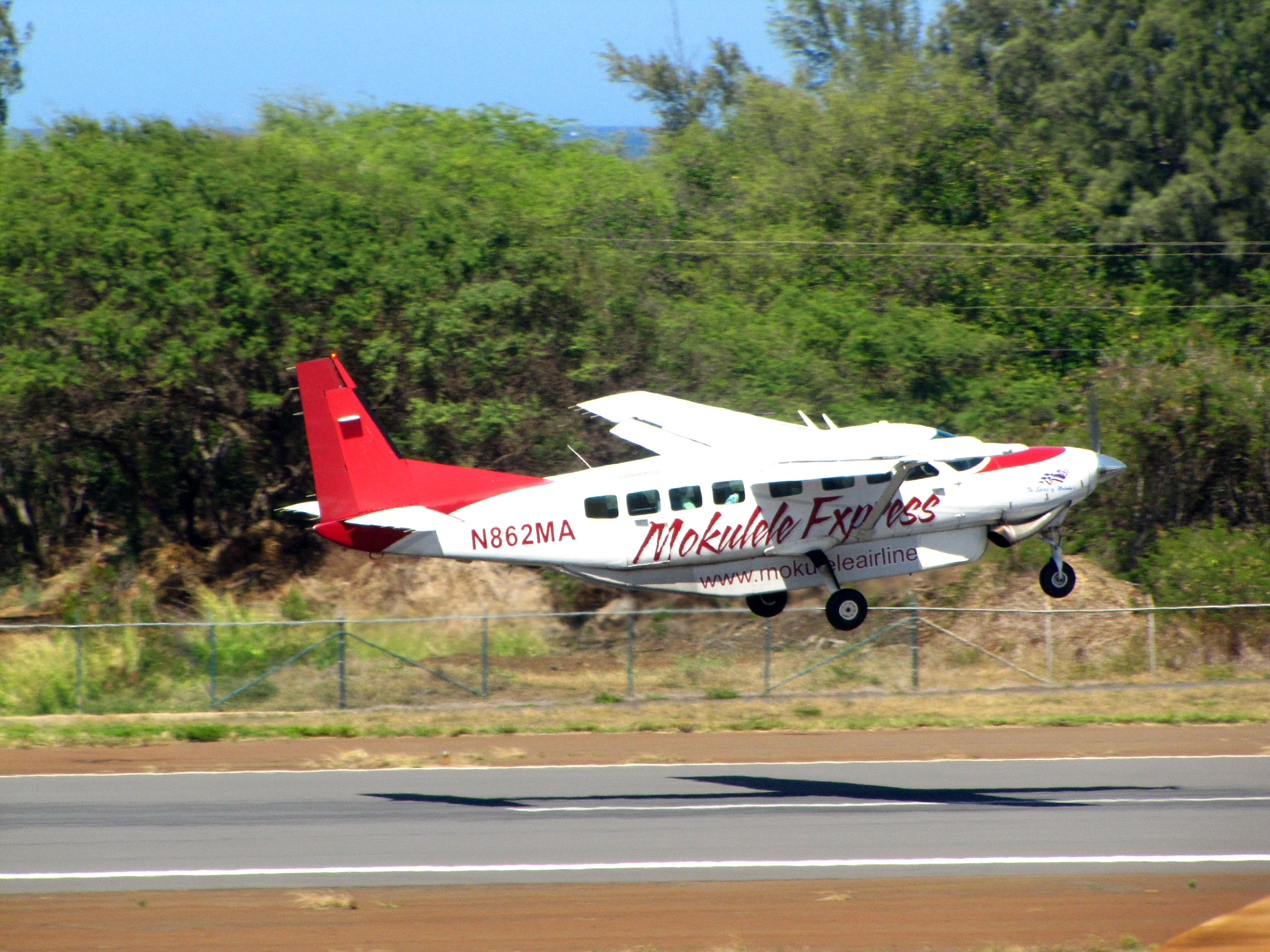
Mokulele Cessna 208B Grand Caravan

In 2005, it was acquired by Boyer Industries, headed by Bill Boyer, Jr., a former baggage handler turned entrepreneur who became the airline's CEO. At the time of the acquisition, the company had a fleet of three Piper Navajo Chieftains and was operating only charters and sightseeing trips to Hawaiʻi Volcanoes National Park, as well as scenic flights around the Big Island and Maui. Mr. Boyer worked on obtaining the authority to operate scheduled services between Kahului Airport on Maui and both Kailua-Kona and Hilo on the Big Island.

In September 2006, the airline announced that it had reached an agreement with Mesa Air Group and its go! division, whereby Mokulele would operate Cessna Grand Caravan aircraft to Kapalua, Molokai, and Lanai under the name go!Express. Service began with flights from Kapalua to Honolulu, Kahului, and Kona on April 17, 2007. Service began for flights to Molokai on July 21, 2007, and flights to Lanai on October 6, 2007.

In January 2008, the airline reached an agreement with Aloha Airlines to provide cargo service to Molokai, Lanai, and Kapalua under the name Aloha Cargo Express beginning in April using a Cessna 208 Cargomaster. Following Aloha's March 2008 bankruptcy, Boyer indicated that he had an agreement with Aloha CEO David Banmiller to work with the buyer of Aloha's cargo operations to continue the Mokulele-Aloha contract. Boyer also stated that the airline would go ahead with cargo operations under its own name, Mokulele Air Cargo.

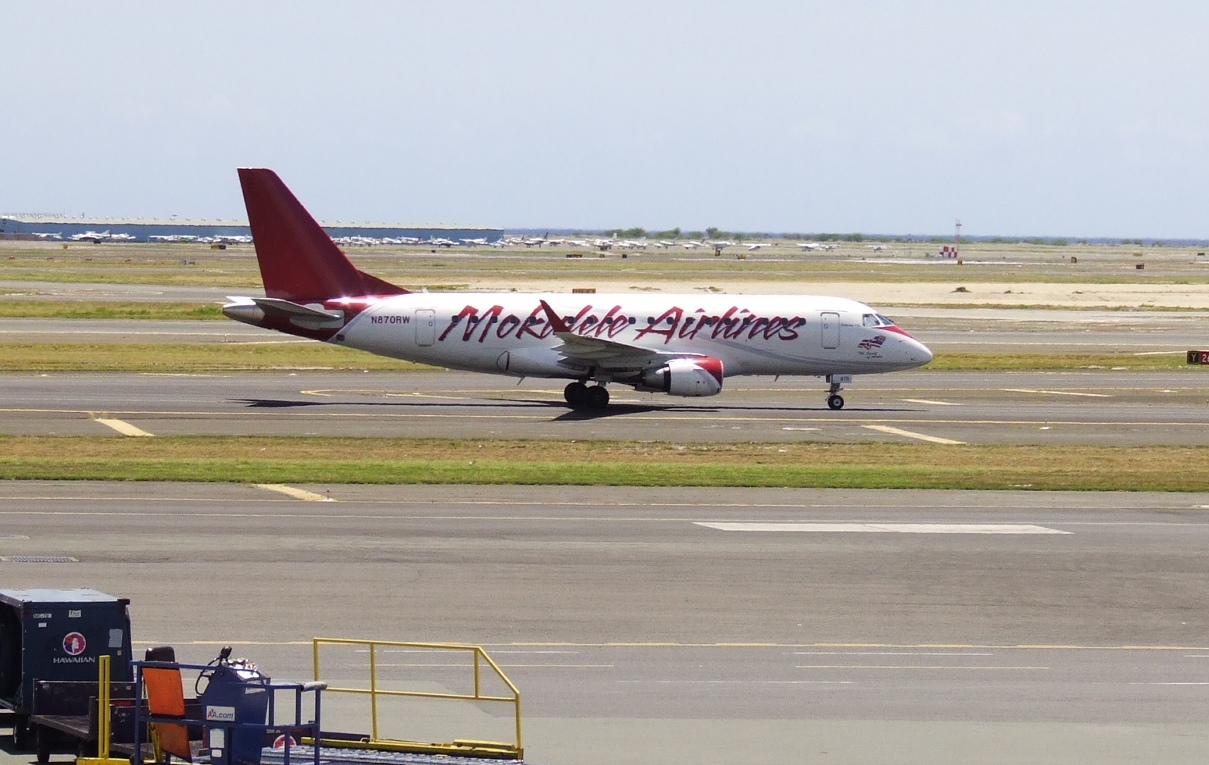
Shuttle America Embraer 170 operating for Mokulele Airlines

In October 2008, Mokulele announced that it had reached an agreement with Republic Airways Holdings to provide inter-island jet service. On November 19, Republic's Shuttle America began operating two Embraer 170 regional jet aircraft on flights between Honolulu, Lihue, and Kona under the Mokulele name, with additional aircraft and destinations to be added in 2009. As a result of Mokulele's entrance into markets that compete directly with go!, that airline later announced that it would end the go!Express agreement with Mokulele in April 2009.

In December 2008, Mokulele Airlines announced partnerships with two larger North American airlines. The first, with Alaska Airlines, allows members of Alaska's Mileage Plan frequent flyer program to earn and redeem miles on Mokulele flights, with a code-sharing agreement hoped for in early 2009. The second, with WestJet, provides access to Mokulele's inter-island flights to WestJet's customers, including sightseeing air tours. Each airline was to promote the other on their respective websites. Mokulele continued to operate flights on behalf of go! Express while also operating its own, independent brand.

After running into financial difficulties earlier in the year, the airline announced in March 2009 that Republic had taken a 50% stake in the company. Boyer relinquished the CEO position to Republic vice president Scott Durgin, moving to head the airline's sales and marketing efforts. Republic also assumed control of the Cessna Grand Caravan aircraft operated by Mokulele. A few days later, Mesa announced that the change of CEO allows the airline to terminate its agreement with Mokulele early, and would terminate the agreement effective March 24, 2009, and nullifying Mokulele agreement to operate Caravans as "go! express."

=== go! Mokulele joint venture ===
In October 2009, Mokulele announced that it was going to join go! and become go! Mokulele. Peter Forman, an airline historian, said that the merger would cause air fares in Hawaii to increase, since go! and Mokulele no longer compete with one another. The merger agreement included a joint venture, with 75% of the joint venture owned by Mesa and 25% owned by Mokulele shareholders. Mesa decreased the size of the operation to just 4 Cessna Grand Caravans.

=== New Mokulele Airlines ===
In November 2011, Mesa Air Group announced that it had sold the go! Mokulele turboprop operation, operated by Mokulele Airlines, to Scottsdale, Arizona-based Transpac Aviation Inc. go!Mokulele's turboprop services continued to be operated by Mokulele under a code share agreement. On Friday, December 9, Mokulele grounded its fleet in conjunction with an internal record-keeping audit. Flights resumed the following Monday.

In December 2011, the airline unveiled plans to begin operating a charter service from Honolulu to Rockford, Illinois and London. When the service was approved by the U.S. Department of Transportation the following month, the schedule showed a Boeing 767-200ER leased from Air Transport International would operate the flights, with the Honolulu to Rockford segment beginning on April 13, 2012, and the Rockford to London segment starting May 4. On April 8, the airline delayed the start of service until at least October. In early 2012, Mesa Air Group announced it would rebrand its jets operations back to the go! name as the name go!Mokulele and Mokulele was causing some brand confusion among the two companies. The airline also abandoned its non-turboprop charter plans so it could focus on service in the isles.

In April 2012, the airline started operating daily service between Maui and Lanai. In July 2012, the airline returned to Kapalua Airport in West Maui, with flights from Honolulu to Kapalua twice per day.

In October 2012, the airline brought a new city to the network, Hana, located on the far east side of Maui. The flights operate twice a day under a partnership with the owners of the resort in Hana. The airline also outsourced eight flights a day to Schuman Aviation – Makani Kai, to bring additional frequencies on the Maui – Kona route, bringing the total daily flights to fifteen on peak days, each way. When Island Air announced plans to retire their fleet of Dash 8 aircraft, Mokulele jumped on the opportunity and ordered additional Caravans to fill the gap.

In March 2014, Mesa Airlines announced the shut down of its go! division in Hawai'i – ending the codeshare relationship between Mesa and Mokulele, allowing the airline to now operate additional flights that were previously prohibited by the codeshare agreement. On April 11, 2014, Mokulele began commuter flights linking Honolulu and Kahului Airport in Maui. The airline also began working with Hawai'i Department of Transportation and Oahu County officials on linking Kahului and Barbers Point/Kalaeloa/John Rodgers Field in West Oahu, and on May 13, 2014, confirmed that flights would begin on July 1.

Starting in February 2015, Mokulele Airlines entered into a one-year wet-lease agreement with Sun Air to provide up to 4 aircraft and crews for Sun Air's EAS Pittsburgh flying. In May 2015, Mokulele and officials publicly announced plans to launch new service in Florida scheduled to begin on November 15, 2015; but it withdrew its plans, claiming that it needed more time to conduct research and that it had been threatened by competitor Silver Airways.

On November 26, 2015, Mokulele Airlines changed its ICAO code to MHO, and its callsign to "Mahalo" for its Hawai‘i flight operations. 2016 also saw the company start a brand-refresh and new services in California.

=== California expansion ===
In February 2016, Mokulele Airlines re-applied for Essential Air Service subsidy for Imperial County Airport and Visalia Municipal Airport after SeaPort Airlines terminated service in late January. Imperial County selected Mokulele, but Visalia voted instead to shift from EAS to request $3.7 million from the Community Flexibility Pilot Program, which pays cities to forego subsidized air service for 10 years in favor of a direct payment of two years’ worth of subsidies. Officials expressed concern over low ridership and a pilot shortage, and Mokulele proposed using the same type of aircraft that SeaPort Airlines flew.

In March 2016, the airline announced that it was considering serving Visalia without a subsidy, but did not pursue. The airline's service to Los Angeles International Airport from Imperial County Airport began on May 23 and from Santa Maria Public Airport on October 10, 2016; with Inyokern Airport scheduled for early 2017. Los Angeles flights were scaled back after congestion added significant taxi and flight times to its operations out of Los Angeles, all related to runway construction at the airport.

=== Acquisition by Southern Airways Express ===
On February 8, 2019, Southern Airways Express purchased the assets of Mokulele Flight Service, Inc. from Transpac Holdings. The company believed by adding Mokulele Airlines to its portfolio, it can lead to additional growth and opportunities, notably its relationship with American Airlines. On May 24, 2019, Mokulele announced it would restore the link between Kahului, Maui and Lana'i City on June 17, 2019, a route it had flown until 2016. The full merger with Southern Airways was completed in February 2020.

=== Electric aircraft ===
In early 2019, Mokulele provided one of its Cessna Grand Caravan to Ampaire, a startup company based in Los Angeles. The company will equip the Caravan with an electric powertrain with plans to introduce commercial service by 2023. Demonstration flights of the Electric EEL were completed in December 2020 on the Kahului to Hana route to test the propulsion system in an operational environment.

Mokulele was selected to be the launch customer for the REGENT Viceroy, an electric ground-effect vehicle, which the manufacturer brands a "seaglider." Mokulele's parent company Southern Airways Express placed an order for 20 of the crafts.

=== Makani Kai Air merger ===
In 2020, Southern Airways Express announced that Mokulele would merge with Makani Kai Air. Flights will be operated and be sold under the Mokulele brand. Operations began to combine on June 15, 2020, and were completed by the end of the year. Makani Kai Air owner Richard Schuman joined Southern as Vice President of Hawaii operations.

Mokulele started operations with two larger Saab 340B Plus aircraft in the summer of 2022. Parent company Southern Airways Express will operate these 30-seat aircraft as public charter flights which Mokulele will sell. The company said the larger aircraft were necessary to fill the gap in service on Molokai and Lanai created by the departure of Ohana by Hawaiian. After several issues with aircraft in early 2023; the airline announced three Tecnam P2012 Traveller aircraft would be brought in as temporary reserve aircraft while Mokulele's Grand Caravans were refurbished and given heavy inspections.

=== Public Listing ===
In July 2023, Surf Air Mobility, the parent company of Mokulele Airlines and Southern Airways Express, went public on the stock market through a direct listing on the New York Stock Exchange.

== Awards ==
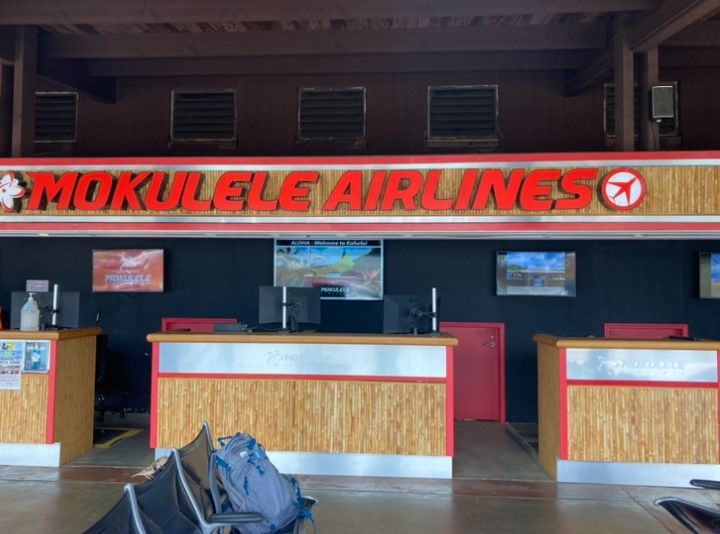
Mokulele Check in at OGG airport commuter terminal

Mokulele Airlines has historically been voted as "Hawai'i's #1 Island Hopper" or Commuter Airline by the local news media, along with awards for the "Best Air Tour".

In 2019, Trip Advisor ranked Mokulele Airlines as the Best Specialty/Leisure Airline in North America.

== Destinations ==
Mokulele Airlines operates flights to the following destinations within the state of Hawaii:

City	Airport	IATA code	Destinations	Notes
Island of Hawaii
Kona	Kona International Airport	KOA	Waimea	
Waimea	Waimea-Kohala Airport	MUE	Kahului Kona	EAS community
Island of Maui
Hana	Hana Airport	HNM	Kahului	EAS community
Kahului	Kahului Airport	OGG	Hana Kona Lanai Molokai Waimea	Hub
Kapalua	Kapalua Airport	JHM	Honolulu	
Island of Molokai
Hoʻolehua	Molokai Airport	MKK	Honolulu Kahului Kalaupapa	
Kalaupapa	Kalaupapa Airport	LUP	Honolulu Ho'olehua	EAS community
Island of Oahu
Honolulu	Daniel K. Inouye International Airport	HNL	Kalaupapa Kapalua Lanai Molokai	Hub
Island of Lanai
Lanai City	Lanai Airport	LNY	Honolulu Kahului	EAS community

=== Interline agreements ===
- Alaska Airlines
- American Airlines
- Hawaiian Airlines
- United Airlines
- Japan Airlines

== Fleet ==
See Southern Airways Express

== Accidents and incidents ==
- Mokulele Flight 1770: On October 21, 2013, Cessna 208B Grand Caravan N861MA made an emergency landing on the Piilani Highway on Maui after its engine failed while en route from Kahului Airport to Waimea-Kohala Airport on Hawaii (island). There were no injuries. During the landing, the airplane struck two highway traffic signs, causing substantial damage to the wing. The aircraft was moved to a parking lot adjacent to the highway during the NTSB investigation and was later dismantled, returned to an airport, reassembled, and returned to service.
