= Surf Air Mobility =

American aviation company

Surf Air Mobility Inc.
- Type: Public
- Traded as: NYSE: SRFM
- Industry: Aviation
- Founded: February 2020
- Founders: Liam Fayed; Sudhin Shahani
- Headquarters: Hawthorne, California, Addison, Texas, United States
- Area served: North America
- Key people: Deanna White (CEO); Carl Albert (Chair)
- Revenue: ▲US$119 million (2024)
- Operating income: ▲US$(197) million (2023)
- Net income: ▲US$(251) million (2023)
- Total assets: ▲US$111 million (2023)
- Total equity: ▼US$(78) million (2023)
- Number of employees: 703 (2024)
- Subsidiaries: Mokulele Airlines; Southern Airways Express; Surf Air
- Website: surfairmobility.com
- Footnotes; Financials as of December 31, 2023. References

Surf Air Mobility Inc. is an American aviation company focused on regional flying. The company plans to develop electric and hybrid powertrains to upgrade existing aircraft. Surf Air Mobility is also developing the AI-enabled SurfOS operating system for the regional air mobility industry. Surf Air Mobility is the parent company of Surf Air, Surf On Demand, and two airlines, Mokulele Airlines and Southern Airways Express.

== History ==
Surf Air Mobility was formed in February 2020 following the acquisition of BlackBird Air. The company also controls Surf Air, a private air travel company providing the ability to access short-haul regional flights that range from 50 to 500 miles.

In September 2020, Surf Air Mobility secured a commitment for $200 million in funding from Global Emerging Markets Group (GEM).

In February 2021, Surf Air Mobility entered an agreement to acquire Ampaire, an electric aviation company that develops hybrid-electric powertrains for aircraft such as the Ampaire Electric EEL based on the Cessna 337 Skymaster and the Cessna Grand Caravan. The agreement has since been called off.

In July 2021, Surf Air Mobility announced that it has entered into an exclusive relationship with Textron Aviation in which Textron Aviation will support Surf Air Mobility's development of an electrified Cessna Grand Caravan, beginning with a hybrid electric Cessna Grand Caravan aircraft. Surf Air Mobility has agreed to purchase up to 150 Cessna Grand Caravan EX single-engine turboprops, with an initial fleet order of 100 aircraft and an option for 50 more.

In July 2023, Surf Air Mobility went public on the stock market through a direct listing on the New York Stock Exchange. Many finance outlets described the move as risky. As part of Surf Air Mobility's debut on the stock market, it completed its acquisition of Southern Airways Express in August 2023.

In March 2024, Surf Air Mobility entered into a MOU agreement with Auric Air to upgrade up to 12 of their Cessna Grand Caravans with Surf Air’s proprietary electrified powertrain technology once certified.

In May 2024, Surf Air Mobility began scheduled commuter service between the Purdue University Airport in West Lafayette, IN and Chicago's O’Hare International Airport. The service provides staff, students, family, friends, and the greater community with easier, faster connections. Also in May 2024, Surf Air Mobility launched Williamsport, PA's only scheduled commuter service that flies between Williamsport Regional Airport and Washington Dulles International Airport.

In June 2024, Surf Air Mobility entered into a MOU agreement with Brazil-based airline operator ASTA to upgrade up to 4 of the Cessna Grand Caravan aircraft with Surf Air’s proprietary electrified powertrain technology once certified.

In August 2024, Surf Air Mobility announced the intention to form a new venture entity, Surf Air Technologies, and entered into a strategic agreement with Palantir Technologies to power the AI-enabled operating system for the regional air mobility industry.

In November 2024, the company unveiled a four-phase transformation plan, in which the first phase is aimed at improving operational reliability and developing new software capabilities to enhance the company's efficiency.

In February 2025, Surf Air Mobility relocated its system operations center (SOC) to Addison, Texas to centralize operations.

In March 2025, Surf Air Mobility announced its initial launch beta users for SurfOS, the AI-enabled operating system designed to support regional air operators, brokers, and aircraft owners.
