= Waimea–Kohala Airport =

Airport in Hawaii, United States

Waimea-Kohala Airport Kahua Mokulele o Waimea-Kohala
- IATA: MUE; ICAO: PHMU; FAA LID: MUE

Summary
- Airport type: Public
- Owner/Operator: Hawaii Department of Transportation
- Serves: Kamuela, Hawaii
- Elevation AMSL: 2,671 ft (814 m)
- Coordinates: 20°00′05″N 155°40′05″W
- Website: hawaii.gov/mue

Map
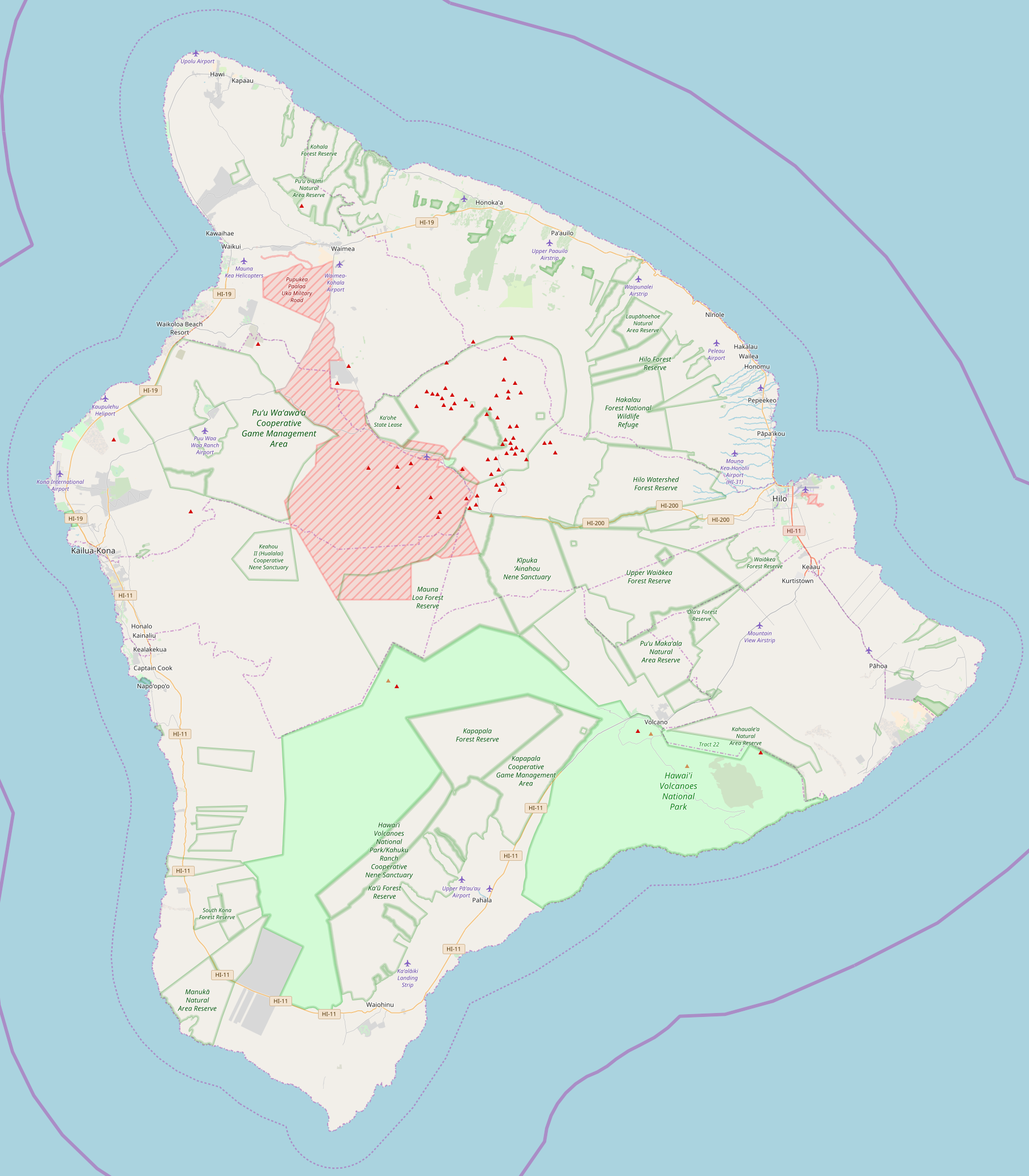
- Location of airport in Hawaii MUE (Hawaii)

Runways
Direction	Length		Surface
Direction	ft	m	Surface
4/22	5,197	1,584	Asphalt

Statistics
- Aircraft operations (2016): 4,178
- Based aircraft (2022): 4
- Sources: Hawaii DOT, FAA

Waimea-Kohala Airport (IATA: MUE, ICAO: PHMU, FAA LID: MUE) is a state-owned public-use airport located one nautical mile (1.2 mi; 1.9 km) southwest of Waimea, an unincorporated town in Hawaii County, Hawaii, United States. It was known as Kamuela Airport until 1969.

Hawaiian Airlines began scheduled passenger service from the airport in November 1953. As of 2016, the only scheduled air service is by Mokulele Airlines, which offers twice daily service to Kahului, Maui.

It is included in the Federal Aviation Administration National Plan of Integrated Airport Systems for 2021–2025, in which it is categorized as a non-primary commercial service facility.

== History ==
Initially, the town of Waimea was served by Kamuela Airport, which was operated by the 3rd Marine Division during World War II for liaison aircraft. However, its short runway and inadequate runway surface could not accommodate Douglas DC-3, and was deemed incapable for commercial use by 1950. Following extensive surveys, construction of the new Kamuela Airport began on January 28, 1952. In April 1953, the runway was completed, and the old Kamuela Airport closed in August of that year. In May 1953, Hawaiian Airlines began DC-3 operations, and started scheduled flights on 1 July, 1953. In 1969, a legislative resolution renamed the new airport to Waimea-Kohala Airport to prevent confusion with Waimea, Kauaʻi.

== Facilities and aircraft ==
Waimea-Kohala Airport covers an area of 90 acres (36 ha) at an elevation of 2,671 feet (814 m) above mean sea level. It has one runway designated 4/22 with an asphalt surface measuring 5,197 by 100 feet (1,584 by 30 m).

The airport has one taxiway and an aircraft parking apron at the west end of the runway serving the passenger terminal and general aviation facilities. No fueling or airport traffic control tower facilities are provided. An aircraft rescue and fire fighting facility shares space in the airport maintenance facility.

For the 12-month period ending June 30, 2016, the airport had 4,178 aircraft operations, an average of 11 per day: 57% air taxi, 31% general aviation and 12% military. In April 2022, there were four aircraft based at this airport: two single-engine and two multi-engine.

== Airlines and destinations ==
Mokulele Airlines serves the airport with Cessna 208EX Grand Caravan commuter turboprop aircraft, connecting it to Kona International Airport at Kailua-Kona on Hawaiʻi Island, and Kahului Airport on Maui.

=== History ===
The airport previously had scheduled passenger jet service operated by Aloha Airlines and Hawaiian Airlines, both of which referred to the airport as Kamuela in their respective system timetables during the 1960s. In 1966, Hawaiian Airlines was operating a daily Douglas DC-9-10 jet flight with a routing of Hilo (ITO) - Kamuela (MUE) - Kahului, Maui (OGG) - Honolulu (HNL) and was also serving the airport with Convair 640 turboprops on flights to Honolulu, Maui and Kona at this time. In 1968, Aloha Airlines was flying daily British Aircraft Corporation BAC One-Eleven jet service with a routing of Kamuela (MUE) - Kahului, Maui (OGG) - Honolulu (HNL) and was also operating flights with Vickers Viscount turboprops with daily nonstop service from Honolulu with this flight continuing on to Kona (KOA) at this time. In 1976, Hawaiian Airlines was operating daily McDonnell Douglas DC-9-30 jet service into the airport with a round trip routing of HNL-OGG-MUE. By 1981, Hawaiian Airlines was serving the airport with de Havilland Canada DHC-7 Dash 7 turboprops on nonstop flights between Waimea and Kahului, Maui and Honolulu.

Princeville Airways/Aloha Island Air also operated to Kamuela airport in the late 1980s and 1990s.

Pacific Wings operated service to Honolulu and Kahului. Originally subsidized by the Essential Air Service program, Pacific Wings began serving Waimea-Kohala without subsidy on April 1, 2007. By May 2013, when reports emerged the airline was ending all service in Hawaii, the airline had already ceased serving Waimea-Kohala Airport. Mokulele Airlines, Schuman Aviation, and Pacific Wings submitted bids to the DOT to provide service at the airport, however only Mokulele and Schuman proposed actual flights—Pacific Wings suggested two buses a day to Kona. On July 2, 2013, the US DOT awarded the contract to Mokulele Airlines for service to Kahului. Mokulele began operating flights to Waimea-Kohala on September 21, 2013.

== See also ==
- List of airports in Hawaii

== Other sources ==
- Essential Air Service documents (Docket OST-1997-2833) from the U.S. Department of Transportation:
  - Order 2005-3-34: Reselecting Pacific Wings Airlines to provide essential air service (EAS) at Hana, Kalaupapa, and Kamuela, Hawaii, for the period from April 1, 2005, through March 31, 2007, at an annual rate of $1,597,422 for the first year and at an annual rate of $1,501,752 for the second year.
  - Order 2006-12-3: Terminating the carrier-selection proceeding for Essential Air Service at Hana, Kalaupapa, and Kamuela, Hawaii. The incumbent EAS carrier, Pacific Wings, has proposed to continue to provide all three communities' EAS on a subsidy-free basis beginning April 1, 2007.
