= REGENT Viceroy =

Electric wing-in-ground-effect watercraft

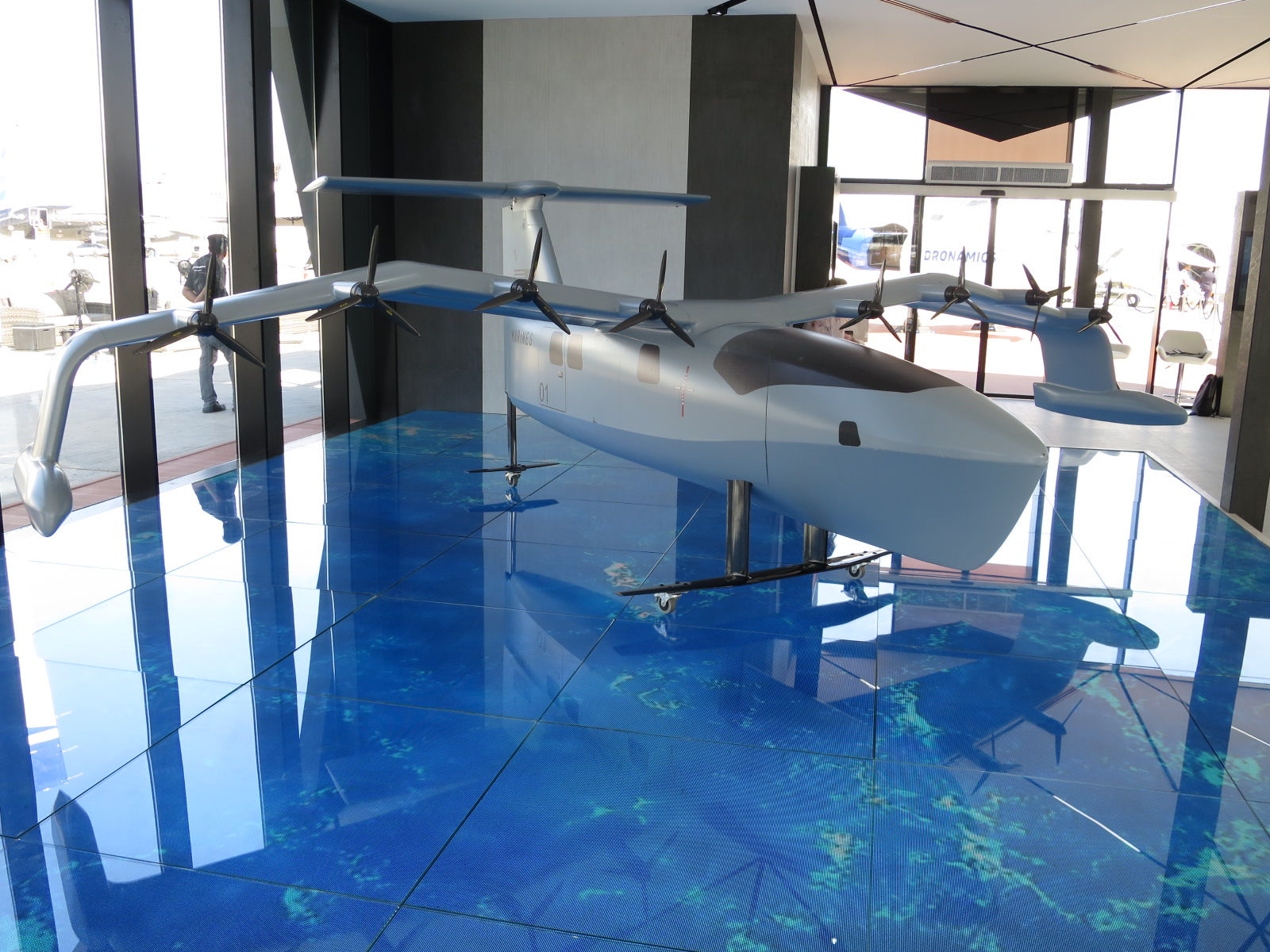
Regent Viceroy seaglider model at Dubai Airshow 2023

The REGENT Viceroy "seaglider" is a proposed electric-powered wing-in-ground-effect vehicle under development by REGENT Craft Inc. of Rhode Island, (REGENT is an acronym, standing for "Regional Electric Ground Effect Nautical Transport"). The aircraft can carry 12 passengers on flights of up to 180 miles (290 km) over coastal waters, with retractable hydrofoils used during the take-off run. Customer deliveries are expected to commence in 2026 to 2027. A 1/4 scale model was successfully demonstrated in 2022 in Narragansett Bay, and a full-scale, crewed prototype was spotted conducting sea trials there during the week of September 15, 2025 as testing continues. A crewed flight was successfully demonstrated on September 2, 2026, with two pilots flying 33 feet above the water for about 30 seconds, covering 1,956 feet.

Announced customers include New Zealand's Ocean Flyer, Brittany Ferries in Europe and US carriers Mesa Airlines, Mokulele Airlines and Southern Airways Express. A feasibility study for use in the Scottish islands is also planned.

== History ==
In 2026, the seaglider completed its maiden flight, covering a distance of 1,956 ft (596 m) at an altitude of 33 ft (10 m) during a 30-second flight, using a triple-redundant fly-by-wire system.

== Regulation ==
It is unclear whether the vehicle would be classified as a marine vessel or an aircraft. In the former case, regulation in United States waters would fall to the US Coast Guard, whereas in the latter the Federal Aviation Administration would be involved – a more arduous and expensive certification.

== Specification ==
Data from REGENT

General characteristics

- Crew: 2
- Capacity: 12 passengers or 3,500 pounds (1,600 kg) cargo
- Length: 57.5 ft (17.5 m)
- Wingspan: 65 ft (20 m)
- Height: 15.5 ft (4.7 m)
- Max takeoff weight: 15,400 lb (6,985 kg)

Performance

- Maximum speed: 180 mph (290 km/h, 160 kn)
- Range: 180 mi (290 km, 160 nmi)
