= Surf Air =

Airline of the United States

IATA	ICAO	Call sign
—	URF	SURFAIR
- Commenced operations: June 13, 2013
- Fleet size: 52
- Destinations: 42
- Parent company: Surf Air Mobility
- Headquarters: Hawthorne, California, United States
- Key people: Deanna White (CEO of Surf Air Mobility)
- Employees: 700
- Website: surfair.com

Surf Air is a Los Angeles-based aviation marketplace offering regional flight services and a strong focus on developing electric aircraft solutions. Surf Air is a subsidiary of Surf Air Mobility.

== History ==
The company was founded by David Eyerly, Wade Eyerly, Peter Bi, Scott Porter, Cory Cozzens, and Reed Farnsworth. Surf Air emerged in 2012 from MuckerLab, a Los Angeles-based business incubator. Angel investors included Paige Craig, Aviv Grill, and Bill Woodward. The Series A round of venture capital was completed in June 2013 with investment from Anthem Venture Partners, NEA, TriplePoint Capital, Siemer Ventures, Baroda Ventures, Gilad Elbaz, Eytan Elbaz, Rick Caruso, Jeffrey Stibel, Mike Walsh, and actor Jared Leto. The company raised at least $9 million from investors, including $500,000 from VegasTechFund (a venture capital fund launched by Tony Hsieh), Velos Partners, and Base Ventures.

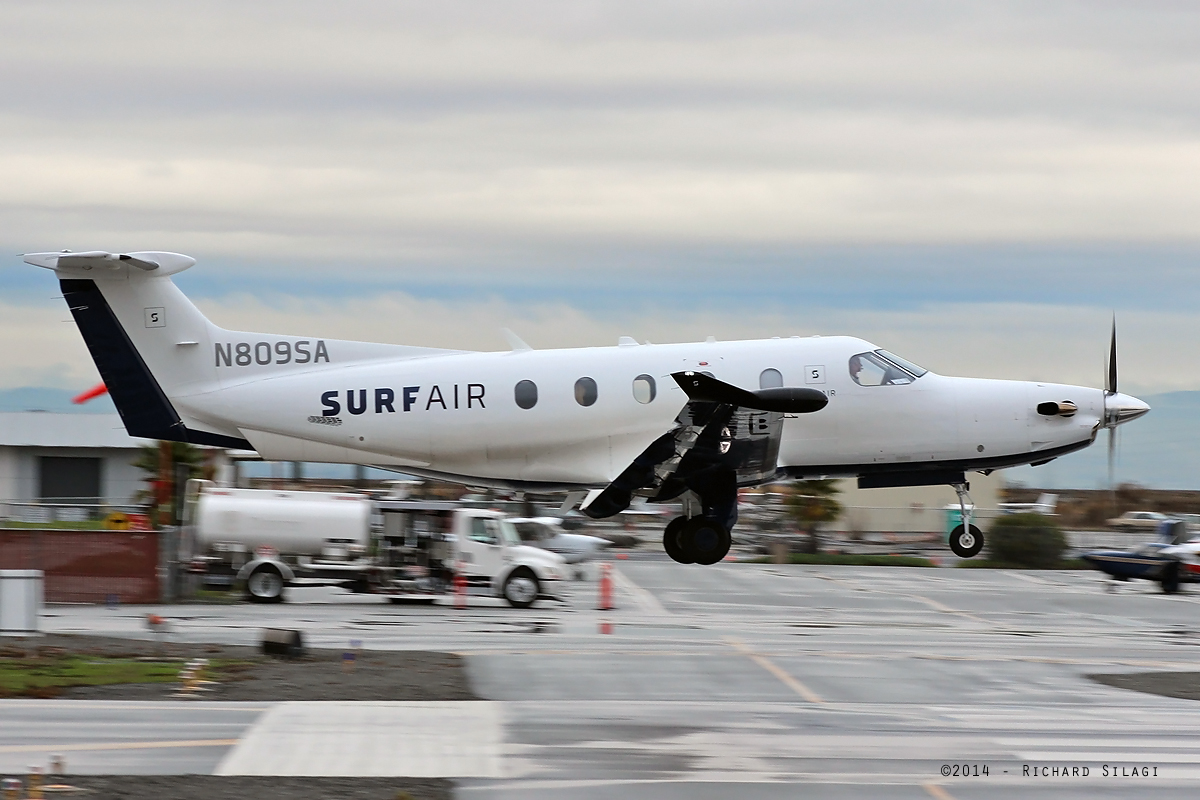
A Pilatus PC-12 at San Carlos Airport (December 2014)

In June 2017, Surf Air expanded its service into Texas with its acquisition of RISE, a Texas-based air travel provider. They service flights to and from Austin Bergstrom, San Antonio International, Dallas Love Field, Houston Hobby, and David Wayne Hooks in Northwest Houston. Dallas entrepreneur Nick Kennedy, who founded RISE, was expected to serve as president of the Texas and southeast region for Surf Air. The former RISE routes have since been transitioned to be operated by Tradewind Aviation instead of in-house.

In July 2017, Surf Air started operations in Europe, debuting its maiden trip from London to Ibiza. Surf Air Europe operated under the same subscription model where customers pay a monthly fee starting from £1,750 ($2,180) for unlimited travel. Surf Air would start with flights from London to Zurich during the week and to Ibiza in Spain at weekends. It had plans to add routes to Cannes, Munich, Luxembourg, and Milan. Surf Air Europe had one Embraer Phenom 300 private jet in its fleet. In October 2017, Surf Air began offering a membership that provides all-you-can-fly in both the European and US networks for £3,150. The company planned to feature dozens more aircraft within the next three to five years.

In February 2018, Surf Air launched an on-demand charter, enabling customers to charter the entire aircraft, including airplanes not in the Surf Air fleet. In March 2018, Surf Air Europe went into liquidation in December 2018. In October 2018, Surf Air announced Surf Air Express, a new membership program targeting less frequent travelers with an annual membership fee and payments for each flight.

On May 16, 2017, Surf Air flight operations were transitioned to Encompass Aviation. Sudhin Shahani took over as Chief Executive of Surf Air in 2017 after Jeff Potter exited. When Encompass took over all Surf Air operations, it retained all Surf Air's pilots and aircraft. Encompass is based in Hawthorne, California and is an FAA Part 135 operator. In June 2018, it was reported the IRS had put liens totaling nearly $2.5 million against Surf Air for unpaid federal excise tax. At the same time, Surf Air said it was changing operators for California flights to Advanced Air Charter from Encompass. Encompass stated the Surf Air was behind on payments due for operating flights for Surf Air.

Surf Air Europe, established in 2017 as the European branch, went into liquidation in December 2018. In February 2020, it announced the acquisition of Blackbird. CEO Shahani hopes that BlackBird's digital platform will allow Surf Air to expand its reach without buying more planes.

In February 2021, Surf Air announced the acquisition of Ampaire which has been developing a hybrid-electric power train for Cessna aircraft. In 2021, Surf Air plans to continue to expand its roster of destinations. For the last year prior to August 2021, Surf Air has expanded from seven to 23 destinations with several more on the way. In 2022, Surf Air continued to see month-to-month increases in flights and passenger count. In April 2022, Surf Air Mobility abandoned its $100 million acquisition of Ampaire.

In July 2023, Surf Air Mobility, the parent company of Surf Air, went public on the stock market through a direct listing on the New York Stock Exchange (under the ticker symbol "SRFM").

== Destinations ==
Surf Air offers On Demand charter flights that can take customers anywhere around the world on their aircraft of choice, but with a focus on regional flight operations.

== Fleet ==
The Surf Air fleet is located under the Southern Airways Express operating certificate. All flights are operated by Southern.

== Certification ==
Surf Air acts as a sales agent. Surf Air does not own or operate any aircraft. All flights arranged by Surf Air for its members are performed by independent, third party FAA-licensed and DOT-registered air carriers.
