= San Carlos Airport (California) =

Municipal airport in San Carlos, California, United States

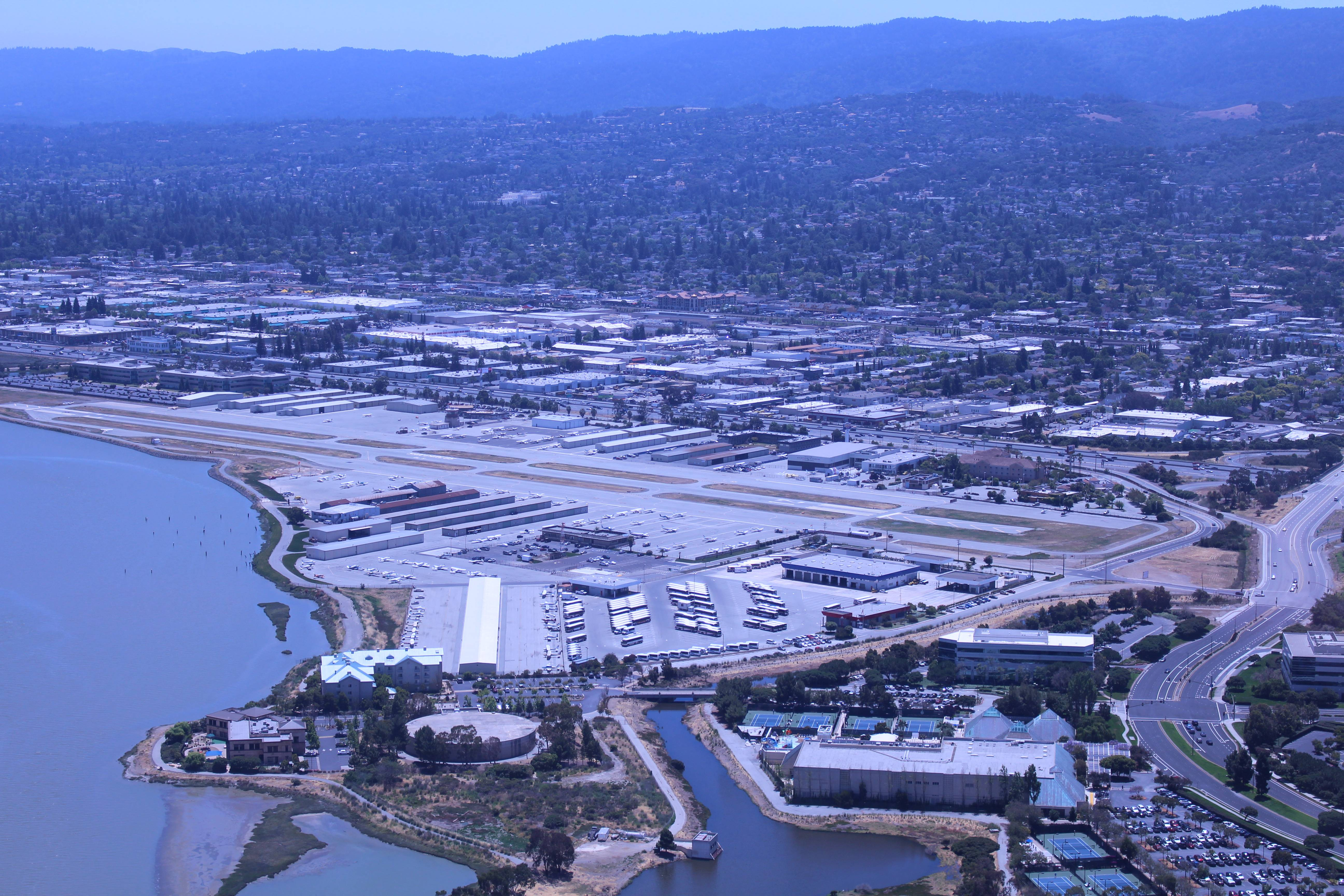

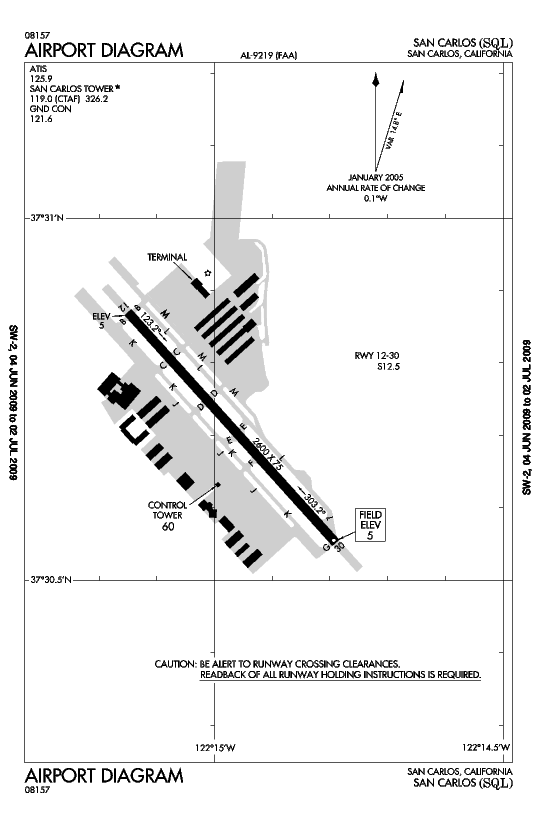
- FAA diagram
- IATA: SQL; ICAO: KSQL; FAA LID: SQL

Summary
- Airport type: Public
- Owner: San Mateo County
- Serves: San Carlos, California
- Elevation AMSL: 5 ft (1.5 m)
- Coordinates: 37°30′43″N 122°14′58″W
- Website: Official website

Map
- Location within California Location within the United States

Runways
| Direction | Length | | Surface |
| Direction | ft | m | Surface |
|---|---|---|---|
| 12/30 | 2,621 | 799 | Asphalt |

Statistics (2020)
- Aircraft operations (year ending 5/31/2020): 75,243
- Based aircraft: 323
- Source: Federal Aviation Administration

San Carlos Airport (IATA: SQL, ICAO: KSQL, FAA LID: SQL) is a public airfield located two miles (3.2 km; 1.7 nmi) northeast of San Carlos, California, in San Mateo County and serves the San Francisco Bay Area.

The airport lies off U.S. Route 101. The airport is home to Civil Air Patrol West Bay Composite Squadron 192. Next to the airport lies the Hiller Aviation Museum.

== History ==
The San Carlos Flying Field was established during World War I by J. Paulding Edwards on a field north of Cordilleras Creek and east of today's Old County Road. A 300-foot-long (91 m) hangar was situated along the western end of Terminal Way. San Carlos' first pilot's license was issued on July 10, 1917 to Lieutenant Prince.

In 1923, the airfield was taken over by the Cooley family. Charles P. Cooley was the primary flight instructor and his father, Frank S. Cooley, operated the field. On July 12, 1940, a fire destroyed the main hangar and twelve aircraft. Operations were maintained on an airstrip bounded by today's Brittan Avenue, Washington Street, Old County Road, and Industrial Road.

Sometime around 1935 the Cooley family established a different airfield near the foot of today's Twin Dolphin Drive in San Carlos. That facility had a 2,100-by-200-foot (640 by 61 m) runway and a building that housed various industrial activities. The Cooley family eventually determined that the airport needed to be moved because its proximity to the Phelps and Steinberger Sloughs limited the length of the runway.

The Cooleys opened another airfield at the present location of the San Carlos airport in 1948. In 1952, ownership was transferred to Francis Michaud, who renamed it San Carlos-Belmont Airport. Repair and administrative buildings were added, and plans were developed to lengthen the runway to 7,000 feet (2,100 m). In 1957, the field was renamed San Mateo County Airport, Inc. Ownership was split between Michaud, the Piombo Construction Company, and six other parties. San Mateo County purchased the property in 1964. Today the airport is completely funded with user and business fees and receives no money from the County's General Fund.

In 1999, a proposal was given to extend the runway by 400 feet (120 m) into the marshy area near Bair Island south of the airport. The proposal encountered opposition among the adjacent residents in Redwood Shores and Foster City, who complained about the potential for increased noise. Opponents felt a longer runway would lead to bigger and noisier planes, in particular, more corporate aircraft of the light jet category. As a result, the runway was not extended.

In 2017, residents complained of excessive noise at the airport caused by flights operated by Surf Air (now operated by Southern Airways Express). They formed a group named Calm The Skies. San Mateo County acknowledged the noise issue caused by Surf Air. Part of the County solution was to introduce an arrival procedure called "Bayside Visual Approach" that underwent testing in 2016 which shifts flights and noise from San Mateo County to the city of Sunnyvale in neighboring Santa Clara County. A curfew has also been discussed in addition to other measures to mitigate the noise.

On January 30, 2025, the County of San Mateo Airports announced that the San Carlos Airport in would enter an ATC Zero state on February 1, 2025, meaning the airport’s Federal Contract Tower would be unstaffed. The Federal Aviation Administration had awarded a new contract for air traffic services at San Carlos Airport to Robinson Aviation, but the contract did not include locality pay adjustments for the high cost of living in the San Francisco Bay Area. As a result, all current air traffic controllers declined employment offers, leading to a loss of air traffic control services. The ATC Zero state was narrowly averted after negotiations led to an acceptable employment contract.

== Facilities ==
San Carlos Airport covers 110 acres (45 ha) at an elevation of 5 feet (2 m). Its one runway, 12/30, is 2,621 by 75 feet (799 by 23 m) with an asphalt surface. Aircraft with gross weight in excess of 12,500 pounds (5,670 kg) are prohibited.

San Carlos Airport is home to over 30 aviation-related businesses. Facilities and FBOs at KSQL include Bay Aerial Helicopter Service, FlyBayArea, JATO Aviation, Rabbit Aviation Services, Surf Air, Zanette Aviation Insurance, West Valley Flying Club, Diamond Aviation Charter, and the San Carlos Flight Center.

The Experimental Aircraft Association (EAA) has a chapter at San Carlos Airport. EAA Chapter 20 had about 50 members as of 2010. An on-field flight school typically hosts monthly meetings on the second Saturday of each month.

In the year ending May 31, 2020, the airport had 75,243 aircraft operations, average 206 per day: 84% general aviation, 16% air taxi and <1% military. 323 aircraft were then based at this airport: 287 single-engine, 23 multi-engine, four jets and nine helicopters.

== Origin of SQL airport code ==
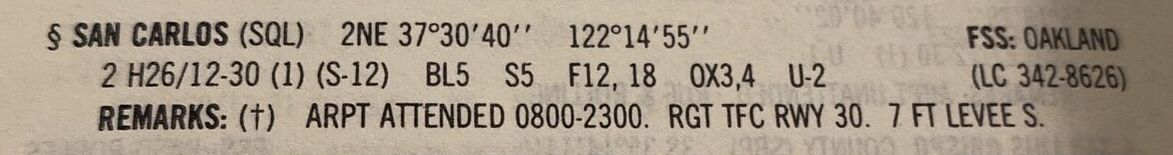
Entry for San Carlos Airport (SQL) in a 1972 Airman's Information Manual

Some have speculated that the airport code of SQL is a humorous reference to the nearby headquarters of Oracle Corporation, a maker of database software. In databases, SQL, or Structured Query Language, is used for handling structured data. However, the airport had the code SQL years before Oracle's predecessor, Software Development Laboratories, was incorporated in June 1977, as it is listed in the Airman's Information Manual published by the Federal Aviation Administration in 1972.

== Accidents and incidents ==
- On September 2, 2010, a Beechcraft Queen Air crashed into a nearby lagoon at Oracle headquarters shortly after takeoff from runway 30, killing all three occupants.
- On October 20, 2017, a Cirrus SR-22 overran the end of runway 30, crashing through a fence and onto adjacent Skyway Road upon takeoff. The two occupants suffered only minor injuries.

== See also ==
- List of airports in the San Francisco Bay Area
