= Kahului Airport =

Commercial airport serving Kahului, Hawaii, United States

Kahului Airport Kahua Mokulele o Kahului
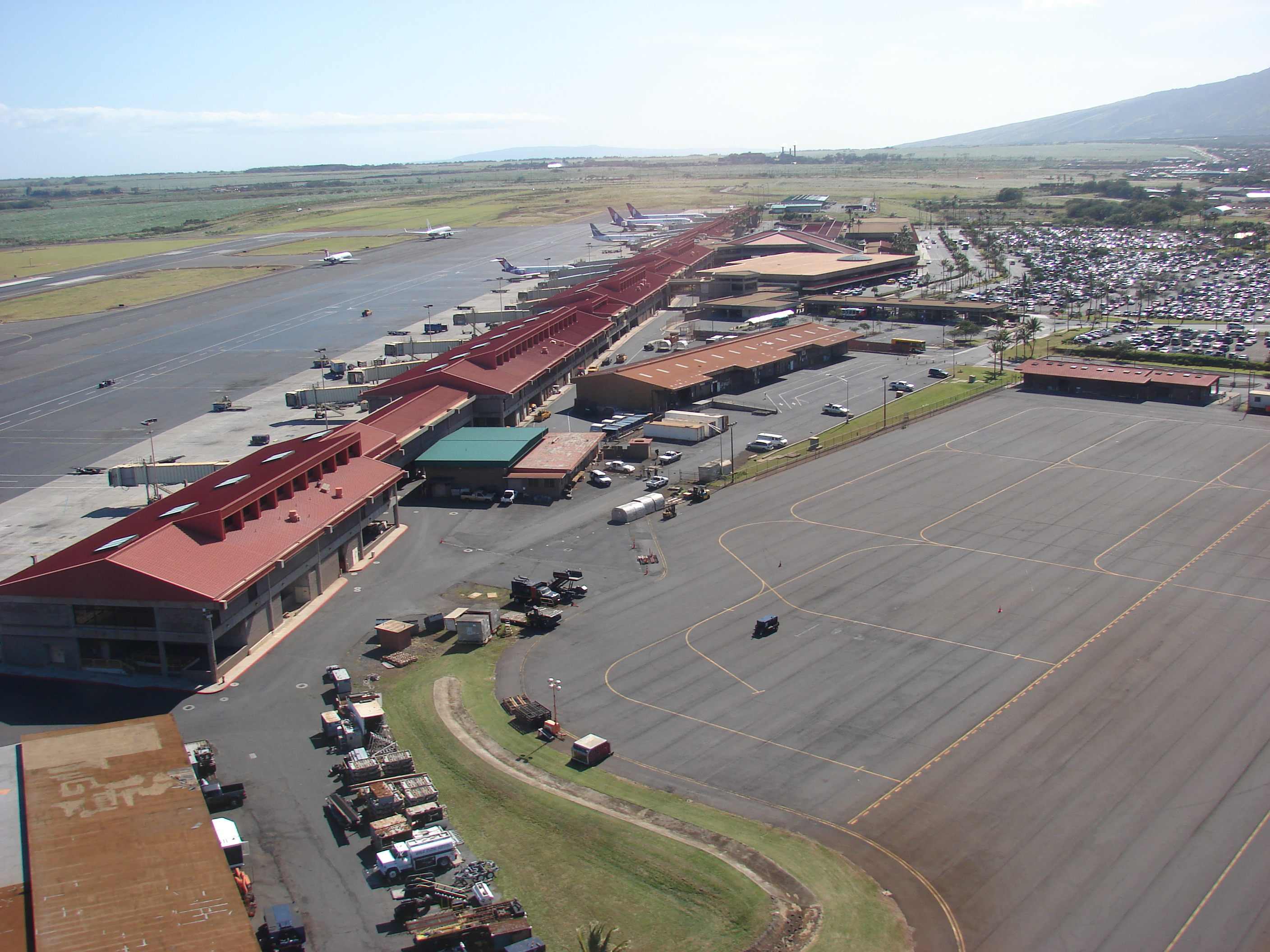
- IATA: OGG; ICAO: PHOG; FAA LID: OGG; WMO: 91190

Summary
- Airport type: Public
- Owner/Operator: Hawaii Department of Transportation
- Serves: Maui
- Opened: 1952; 74 years ago
- Hub for: Hawaiian Airlines; Mokulele Airlines
- Elevation AMSL: 54 ft (16 m)
- Coordinates: 20°53′55″N 156°25′50″W
- Website: www.hawaii.gov/ogg

Maps
- FAA airport diagram
- Interactive map of Kahului Airport

Runways
Direction	Length		Surface
Direction	ft	m	Surface
02/20	6,998	2,133	Asphalt
05/23	4,980	1,518	Asphalt

Helipads
Number	Length		Surface
Number	ft	m	Surface
H1	124	38	Asphalt

Statistics (2025)
- Aircraft operations: 118,304
- Passengers: 7,127,946 ▲1%
- Total cargo (tons): 57,126
- Source: Hawaii State Department of Transportation Federal Aviation Administration

Kahului Airport (IATA: OGG, ICAO: PHOG, FAA LID: OGG) is the main airport of Maui in the state of Hawaii, United States, located east of Kahului. It has offered full airport operations since 1952. Many flights into Kahului originate from the Daniel K. Inouye International Airport in Honolulu; the Honolulu–Kahului corridor is one of the heaviest-trafficked air routes in the US, ranking 13th in 2004 with 1,632,000 passengers.

The FAA/IATA airport code OGG pays homage to aviation pioneer Bertram J. "Jimmy" Hogg, a Kauai native who worked for what is now Hawaiian Airlines, flying aircraft ranging from eight-passenger Sikorsky S-38 amphibians to Douglas DC-3s and DC-9s into the late 1960s.

It is included in the Federal Aviation Administration (FAA) National Plan of Integrated Airport Systems for 2021–2025, in which it is categorized as a medium-hub primary commercial service facility.

== History ==
In response to the Attack on Pearl Harbor on nearby Oahu, the U.S. entered World War II. The demands of war required a proper air station on Maui, so the Navy acquired approximately 1,341 acres (543 ha) of sugar cane fields near Kahului and beginning construction in 1942. Following the end of the war in 1945, the Territory of Hawaii began negotiations to convert Naval Air Station Kahului into a civil airport to replace the inadequate airport near Puunene.

Extensive negotiations between the Territory of Hawaii and the Navy resulted in a gradual transition of the base to civilian control. By December 1947, jurisdiction was transferred to the Territory, and the Hawaii Aeronautics Commission assumed custodial oversight. During this time, work began to prepare the airfield for its new role. A passenger terminal was built from surplus military materials, an old shop was remodeled into a refrigerated air freight building, and the navigational and runway lighting systems were installed. In June 1952, Congress authorized the Navy to transfer ownership of the airport to the Territory.

Over the following decades, the airport underwent substantial infrastructure development. Key milestones included the completion of a new control tower in 1958 and the construction of a permanent terminal building by 1966. Expansion continued through the 1980s, with the addition of a commuter terminal and a new main terminal constructed between 1985 and 1990.

Originally designed to accommodate interisland flights, Kahului Airport saw a shift in traffic patterns beginning in the mid-1980s with the arrival of its first scheduled mainland service. The growing demand for transpacific flights necessitated multiple terminal expansions to accommodate larger aircraft.

In the 21st century, modernization efforts continued. The ticket lobby and baggage claim areas were expanded in 2005, followed by the construction of a new airport access road in 2016. A consolidated rental car facility, linked to the terminal via a tram, opened in 2019. By 2025, a major renovation on the south side of the terminal merged two previously separate hold rooms and enclosed an open-air walkway, creating a 17,000-square-foot (1,600 m^{2}), air-conditioned waiting area.

== Authority ==
Kahului Airport is part of a centralized state structure governing all of the airports and seaports of Hawaii. The official authority of Kahului Airport is the Governor of Hawaii. The governor appoints the Director of the Hawaii State Department of Transportation, who has jurisdiction over the Hawaii Airports Administrator.

The Hawaii Airports Administrator oversees six governing bodies: Airports Operations Office, Airports Planning Office, Engineering Branch, Information Technology Office, Staff Services Office, and Visitor Information Program Office. Collectively, the six bodies have authority over the four airport districts in Hawaii: Hawai'i District, Kaua'i District, Maui District and the principal O'ahu District. Kahului Airport is a subordinate of Maui District officials.

== Facilities and aircraft ==
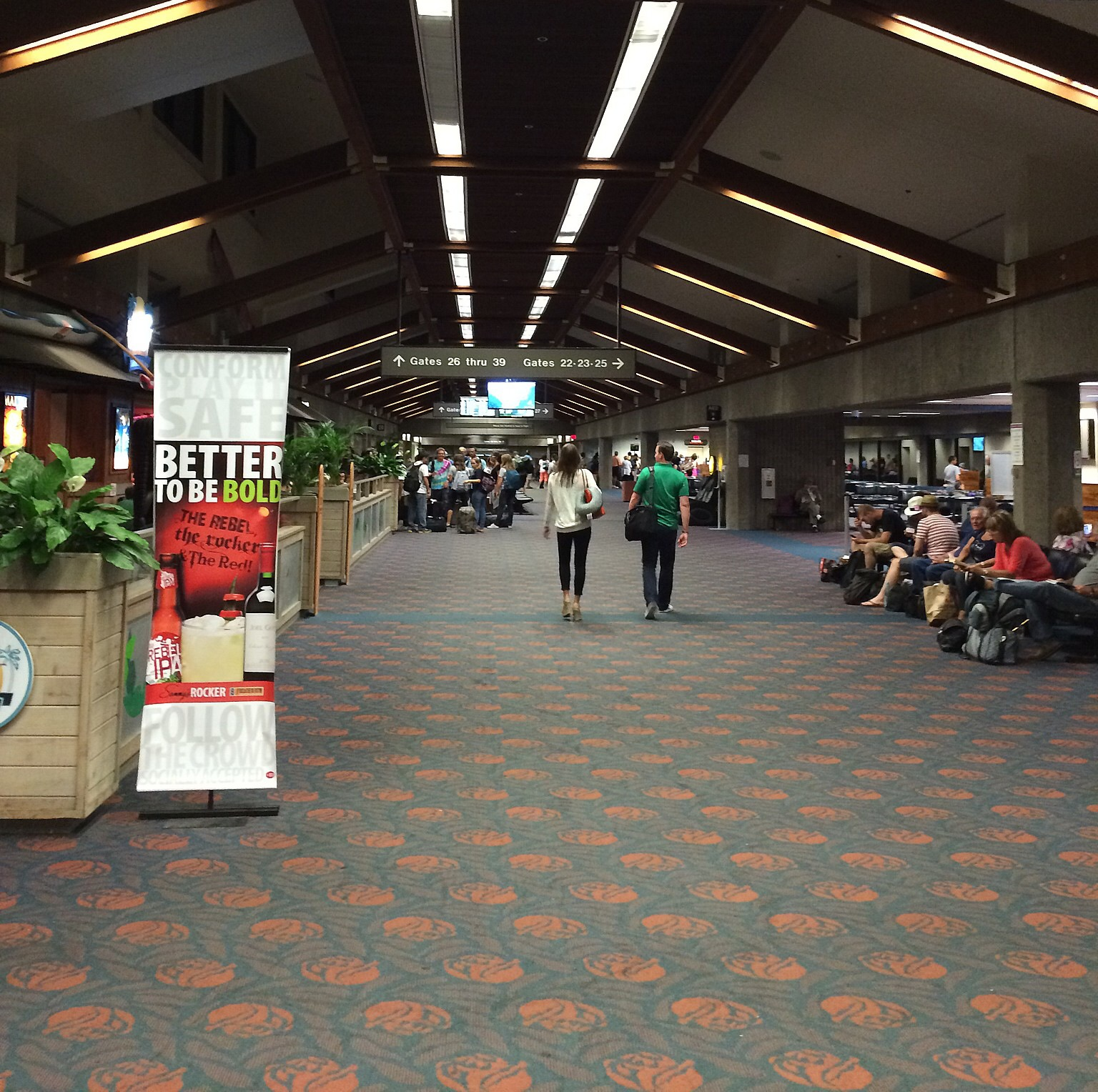
Overseas concourse at Kahului Airport

The Kahului Airport is in Maui County. It is not in any census-designated place.

The Kahului Airport terminal building has ticketing, USDA agricultural inspection, and baggage claim areas on the ground level.

Sixteen jetways are available for enplaning or deplaning passengers. Gates with odd numbers have a jetway, while the rarely used gates with even numbers have stairs that lead to the ramp below. The main passenger terminal is divided into two areas, north and south. The south area houses Gates 1–16 with seven aircraft parking positions (sized for four narrow-body and three wide-body aircraft). The north area houses Gates 17–39 with nine aircraft parking positions (sized for three narrow-body and six wide-body aircraft). Inter-island gates are Gates 9, 11, 13, 15, 17, 19, and 21. Overseas gates are Gates 1, 5, 7, 23, 27, 29, 33, 35, and 39.

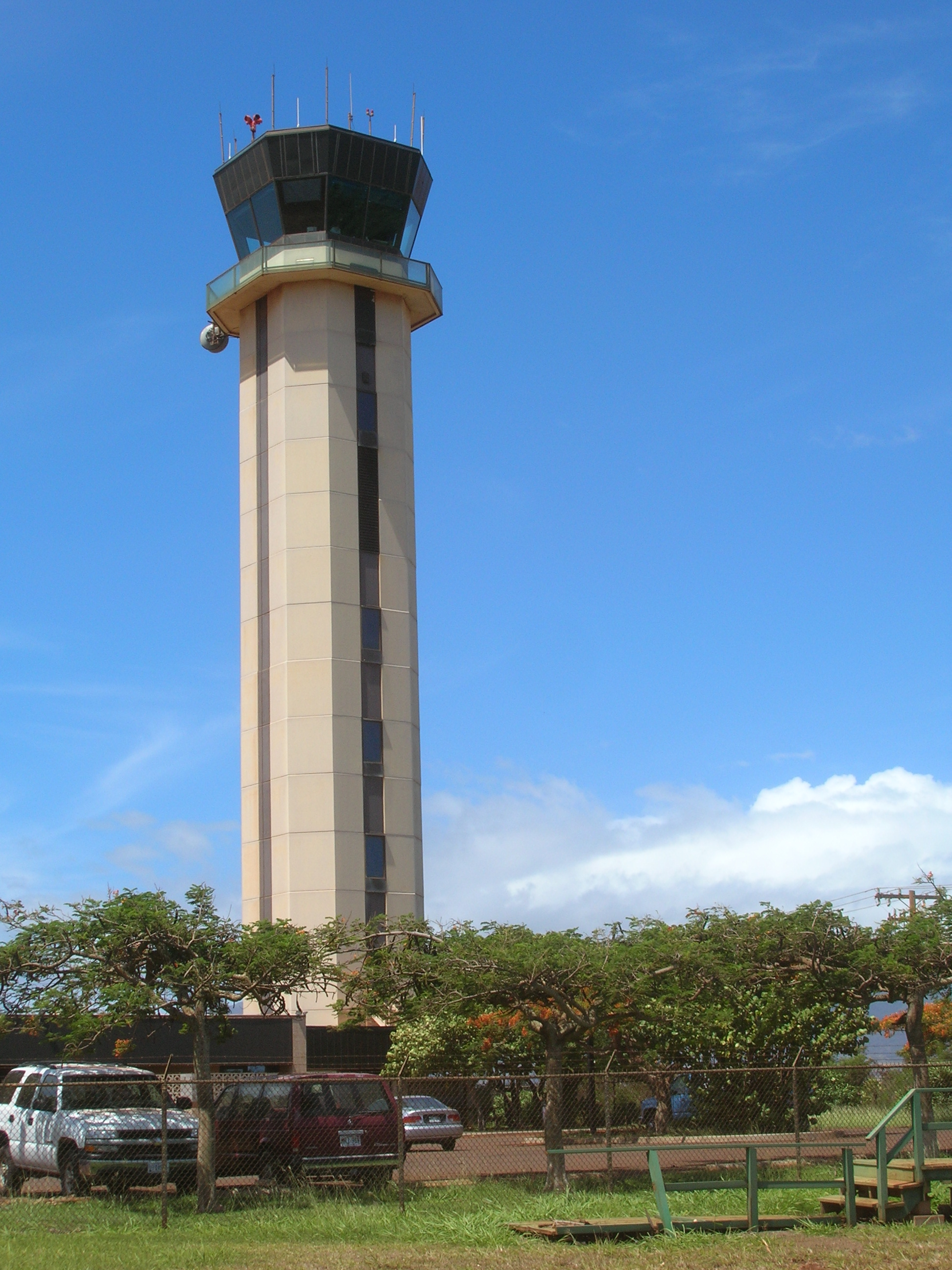
Air traffic control tower at OGG

Most of the gates were spaced to handle narrow-body aircraft like the Boeing 717 and 737 used on inter-island flights. In 1982–83 Kahului started receiving nonstop flights from the United States mainland using much larger transoceanic aircraft. Today they include wide-body aircraft, like the Airbus A330, Boeing 767, and Boeing 777, and narrow-body craft like the Boeing 737-800. The smaller aircraft used on inter-island flights fit at all gates, while the larger overseas airliners cannot. Because of the size of the wide-body aircraft, Gates 3, 25, 31, and 37 are rarely used. The air traffic control tower stands 187 feet (57 m) above mean sea level and was completed in 1988.

The airport is going through expansion authorized by the Hawaii State Legislature. A goal has been set to prepare Kahului Airport to eventually become a permanent international airport with service routes from Canada and Japan. Current flights from Canada use United States border preclearance facilities in Vancouver, Calgary or Edmonton. Under the December 2016 Kahului Airport Master Plan Update, two more aircraft parking positions would be added to the thirteen existing for the main passenger terminal. The current thirteen positions are sized for three inter-island and ten overseas aircraft.

There is one lounge operated by Hawaiian Airlines, the Premier Club, located across from Gate 17.

=== Airfield ===
OGG runway and terminal diagram

Kahului Airport covers 1,391 acres (563 ha) at an elevation of 54 feet (16 m) above mean sea level. It has two asphalt runways: 2/20 is 6,998 ft × 150 ft (2,133 m × 46 m) and 5/23 is 4,980 ft × 150 ft (1,518 m × 46 m). It also has an asphalt helipad designated H1 measuring 125 ft × 125 ft (38 m × 38 m). Helicopters operate from the area directly east of the approach end of Runway 2. No fixed-wing aircraft are permitted in this area between sunrise and sunset, and fixed-wing operations in this area from sunset to sunrise require prior authorization.

Most commercial flights use Runway 2, which is equipped with a Category I Instrument Landing System. Runway 5 is primarily used for lighter commuter aircraft and general aviation. For noise abatement, flights taking off from Runway 2 are directed to climb straight ahead after takeoff until clear of the shoreline by 1 mile (1.6 km) before making any turns. Flights taking off from Runway 5 for destinations east or west are directed to turn left as soon as possible to clear the shoreline by 1 mile (1.6 km); flights from Runway 5 for destinations south are directed to turn right as soon as possible. Flights landing on Runway 2 detour west of Kahului and Wailuku on a heading almost directly south before lining up for landing. Flights landing on Runway 5 follow the coastline and avoid overflying populated areas as much as possible.

Under the OGG Master Plan, Runway 2 would be lengthened (to the south) to 8,530 ft (2,600 m) by 2021, allowing operations with long-distance aircraft carrying a full load of fuel at maximum take-off weight. This would enable nonstop service from Kahului to Chicago, Dallas, and Denver with Boeing 777-200 aircraft. In addition, a parallel 7,000 ft × 150 ft (2,134 m × 46 m) runway to 2/20 would be constructed in the future, with a centerline separation of 2,500 feet (760 m). The parallel runway would enable simultaneous operations and would serve as a backup to Runway 2. Runway 2 has been experiencing pavement distress since 2008, and reconstruction to a concrete surface (from the present grooved asphalt) is recommended.

== Airlines and destinations ==
=== Passenger ===
Airlines	Destinations
Aero	Seasonal charter: Los Angeles–Van Nuys
Air Canada	Seasonal: Vancouver
Alaska Airlines	Honolulu, Portland (OR), San Diego, Seattle/Tacoma; Seasonal: Anchorage
American Airlines	Dallas/Fort Worth, Los Angeles, Phoenix–Sky Harbor; Seasonal: Chicago–O'Hare (begins December 17, 2026)
Delta Air Lines	Los Angeles, Salt Lake City, Seattle/Tacoma; Seasonal: Atlanta, Minneapolis/St. Paul
Hawaiian Airlines	Hilo, Honolulu, Kailua-Kona, Las Vegas, Lihue, Long Beach, Los Angeles, Oakland, Sacramento, San Francisco, San Jose (CA), Seattle/Tacoma
Mokulele Airlines	Hana, Kailua-Kona, Lanai, Molokai, Waimea
Southwest Airlines	Honolulu, Kailua-Kona, Las Vegas, Lihue, Oakland, Phoenix–Sky Harbor, San Diego; Seasonal: Sacramento, San Jose (CA)
United Airlines	Chicago–O'Hare, Denver, Los Angeles, San Francisco
WestJet	Calgary, Vancouver; Seasonal: Edmonton

=== Cargo ===
Airlines	Destinations
Aloha Air Cargo	Hilo, Honolulu, Kailua-Kona, Lihue
Atlas Air	Kailua-Kona, Ontario
Kamaka Air	Honolulu
Transair	Hilo, Honolulu
UPS Airlines	Kailua-Kona, Ontario

=== Top destinations ===
Busiest domestic routes from OGG (September 2025 – August 2026)
Rank	City	Passengers	Carriers
1	Honolulu, Hawaii	951,860	Hawaiian, Southwest
2	Los Angeles, California	366,090	Alaska, American, Delta, Hawaiian, United, Southwest
3	Seattle–Tacoma, Washington	283,650	Alaska, Delta, Hawaiian
4	San Francisco, California	246,670	Alaska, Hawaiian, United
5	Phoenix–Sky Harbor, Arizona	137,310	American, Hawaiian, Southwest
6	Kailua-Kona, Hawaii	132,040	Hawaiian, Mokulele, Southwest
7	San Diego, California	127,190	Alaska, Southwest
8	Lihue, Hawaii	126,140	Hawaiian, Southwest
9	Dallas/Fort Worth, Texas	117,180	American
10	Oakland, California	111,180	Alaska, Hawaiian, Southwest

Busiest international routes from OGG (August 2025 – July 2026)
Rank	City	Passengers	Carriers
1	Vancouver, Canada	157,056	Air Canada, Westjet
2	Calgary, Canada	38,660	Westjet
3	Edmonton, Canada	11,428	Westjet

=== Airline market share ===
Largest airlines at OGG (September 2025 – August 2026)
Rank	Airline	Passengers	Share
1	Alaska Airlines	2,655,000	39.92%
2	Southwest Airlines	1,092,000	16.42%
3	Hawaiian Airlines	972,000	14.62%
4	United Airlines	805,000	12.10%
5	American Airlines	580,000	8.71%
—	Other	548,000	8.24%

== Public transport ==
Maui Bus operates two routes that stop at Kahului Airport. Route 35 Haiku Islander and Route 40 Upcountry Islander stop at the airport, both starting in Kahului. Route 35 connects the airport with Paia and Haiku, while Route 40 connects Pukalani, Makawao, and Haliimaile to the airport.

== Accidents and incidents ==
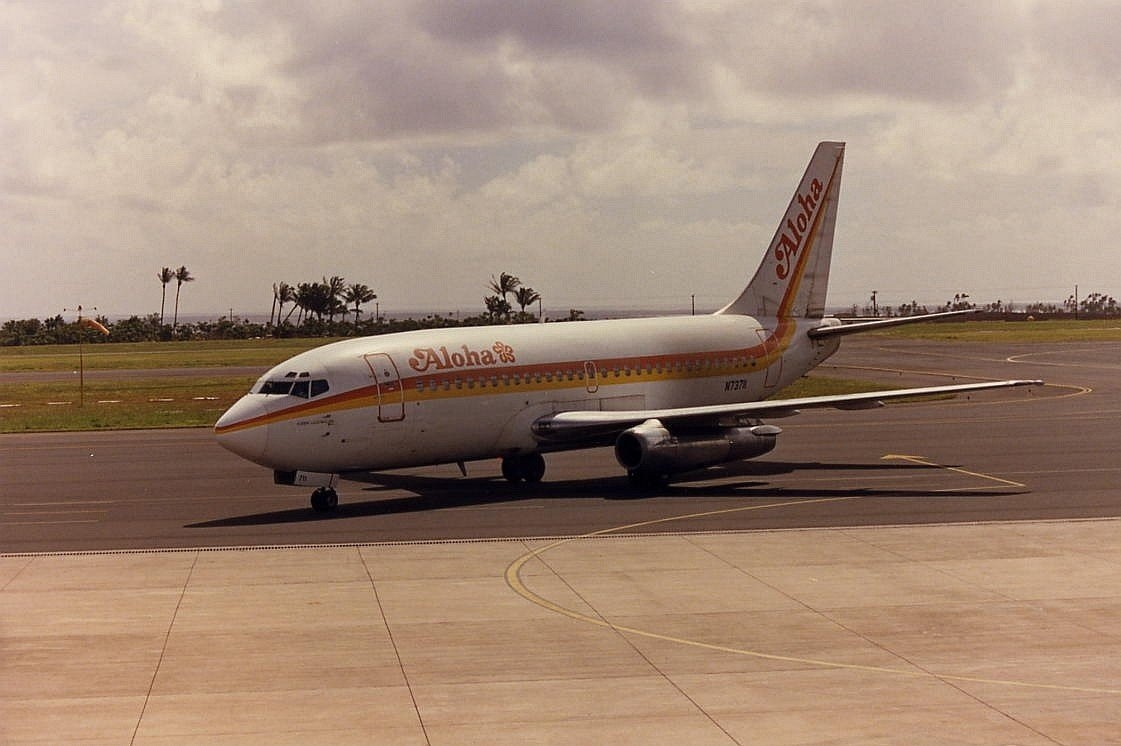
N73711 at Kahului in February 1988. Two months later it emergency landed at the same airport as Flight 243

=== Aloha Airlines Flight 243 ===
On April 28, 1988, Aloha Airlines Flight 243, a Boeing 737-200 inter-island flight from Hilo Airport to Honolulu International Airport carrying 89 passengers and six crew members, experienced explosive decompression when an 18-foot section of the fuselage roof and sides were torn from the aircraft. A flight attendant was sucked out of the aircraft and died. Several passengers sustained life-threatening injuries including massive head wounds. The aircraft declared an emergency and landed at Kahului Airport. Noise created by the rush of air rendered vocal communication impossible, and the pilots had to use hand signals during landing.

Investigations of the disaster, headquartered at Honolulu International Airport, concluded that the accident was caused by metal fatigue. The disaster caused most major United States air carriers to evaluate their older aircraft models.

=== Aloha IslandAir Flight 1712 ===
On October 28, 1989, Aloha IslandAir Flight 1712, a de Havilland Canada DHC-6 Twin Otter aircraft, collided with mountainous terrain near Halawa Valley, Molokai, while en route on a scheduled passenger flight from Kahului Airport to Molokai Airport in Hoolehua. All 20 aboard the aircraft died. Thirteen of the victims were from Molokai, including eight members of the Molokai High School boys' and girls' volleyball teams and two faculty members. The girls' team had just qualified on Maui for the state tournament.

The National Transportation Safety Board (NTSB) determined the cause of the accident was the airplane's controlled flight into terrain as a result of the decision of the captain to continue to operate the flight under visual flight rules at night into instrument meteorological conditions, which obscured rising mountainous terrain.

=== Hawaii Air Ambulance ===
On March 8, 2006, a Hawaii Air Ambulance Cessna 414 was making an approach to Runway 5 when it crashed into a BMW dealership about a mile from the airport. A pilot and two paramedics were killed in the accident.

=== Guardian Flight ===
On December 15, 2022, a Guardian Flight Air Ambulance Beechcraft King Air was making a flight from Kahului to Waimea to pick up a patient, when it crashed into the Alenuihāhā Channel. The crash resulted in the death of all onboard, the pilot, flight nurse and paramedic. Avionics failures resulted in the loss of the autopilot and primary flight displays. In the aftermath, the pilot became spatially disoriented, entered a spin, and broke up before impact with the water.

== See also ==
- Kahului Airport Tram
- List of airports in Hawaii
