= Southern Airways Express =

Airline of the United States

- Southern Airways Express Cessna 208 Caravan
| IATA | ICAO | Call sign |
|---|---|---|
| 9X | FDY | FRIENDLY |
- Founded: 2013
- Commenced operations: June 2013
- AOC #: 141A246O
- Hubs: Dallas/Fort Worth; Los Angeles; Memphis; Phoenix; Pittsburgh; St. Louis; Washington–Dulles (ends January 31, 2027)
- Fleet size: 38
- Destinations: 16
- Parent company: Surf Air Mobility
- Headquarters: Addison, Texas, U.S.
- Key people: Deanna White (CEO of Surf Air Mobility)
- Employees: 700
- Website: iflysouthern.com

Southern Airways Express is a commuter airline operating across the United States with headquarters in Addison, Texas. The majority of Southern's routes are subsidized through the Essential Air Service program by the United States Department of Transportation.

Southern Airways Express is a subsidiary of Surf Air Mobility.

== History ==
Southern Airways Express was founded in 2013 by Stan Little, a litigation attorney in Hernando, Mississippi. Little owned a Golden Eagle 421 which was never used by the airline, although his private pilot, Scott Honnoll, did transition to the airline and advanced to the role of assistant chief pilot before returning to general aviation in November 2015. Southern's initial funding was secured by a group of unknown investors, many of whom are believed to be connected to the University of Mississippi, the alma mater of Little and co-founder Keith Sisson.

The airline launched operations in June 2013, with its first flight from Olive Branch Airport near Memphis, Tennessee, to Destin Executive Airport. Early destinations included University-Oxford Airport, Birmingham Shuttlesworth International Airport, New Orleans Lakefront Airport, and Northwest Florida Beaches International Airport. Due to the nature of the flights being public charters, the airline did not originally use TSA terminals. During the first year, the airline was run experimentally, operating different routes to test demand.

In its first year, Southern operated as a DOT Part 380 scheduled charter provider, with the flights being operated by Executive Express Aviation of Sugar Grove, Ill. In March 2014, Southern made its first acquisition, acquiring Executive Express and its FAA charter certificate, retaining all of its employees in the process. (Executive Express Aviation was later sold to FLOAT Shuttle in 2019 for an undisclosed sum, when all Southern-operated flights were consolidated to its primary certificate.)

In the fall of 2015, Southern Airways began operating its first Essential Air Service flights on behalf of SeaPort Airlines, but it discontinued that service when Seaport Airlines filed for bankruptcy in January 2016. A year later, Southern Airways was awarded Seaport's former routes to Arkansas' Boone County Airport, Hot Springs Memorial Field Airport, and South Arkansas Regional Airport, and enplanements have grown markedly at all three cities in the years since.

On March 7, 2016, Southern announced its second acquisition, Fort Lauderdale-based Sun Air Express. Sun Air flew multiple EAS routes in the mid-Atlantic region, immediately strengthening Southern's presence in the federal program. The airline retired all of Sun Air's aging Piper aircraft in favor of the newer, turbine-powered Cessna Caravan, and it retired the Sun Air name from use in scheduled service. Following the acquisition of Sun, the operational headquarters of Southern Airways was relocated from Memphis to Pompano Beach, Florida.

In February 2019, Southern Airways acquired Mokulele Airlines, its third airline acquisition in five years. The Hawaii-based commuter airline also flew the Cessna Caravan, making it a logical target for Southern. Since the acquisition, Southern has worked to retain and strengthen the Mokulele brand in the Hawaiian islands and now serves 10 airports in the state. It is the largest inter-island carrier by daily departures. Southern recently announced its intention to bring 30-seat aircraft to its Hawaiian footprint to add to its 14 Caravans operating in the state. The Southern Airways Express Saab 340s started operating in Hawai'i in July 2022, with service linking Honolulu to Lana'i and Moloka'i. The planes will not take on the Mokulele brand, instead retaining the Southern Airways continental livery. In addition, Southern/Mokulele has partnered with California-based AmpAire to bring hybrid-electric aircraft to Hawaii. The initial test flights took place in December 2020.

On April 30, 2019, it was announced that SkyWest has a strategic minority investment in the company.

Shortly after the COVID-19 pandemic caused a mandatory inter-island quarantine in Hawaii, Southern/Mokulele announced its fourth acquisition: Honolulu-based Makani Kai Air, a division of Schuman Aviation. CEO Richard Schuman joined Mokulele as its Executive Vice President for Hawaii, and the Makani Kai Aircraft began the transition to Mokulele livery. As of May 2021, Southern/Mokulele was operating 220 peak-day departures system-wide, with approximately 120 of those in Hawaii.

In early 2020, Southern Airways became the exclusive codeshare partner for Tailwind Air Service. Southern markets and sells the flights under its 9X code on both its reservation system and the Global Distribution Systems. Tailwind Air Service, a former scheduled passenger and charter seaplane operator, was the operator of the flights.

In June 2021, Southern switched its east coast hub from Baltimore-Washington International Airport back to Washington Dulles International Airport, where it offers the third-highest number of daily destinations behind United Airlines and Delta Air Lines.

On March 28, 2022, it was announced that Air Choice One was being acquired by Southern Airways Corporation (SAC), parent company of Southern Airways Express, but keeping both air operator's certificates separate.

On March 30, 2023, it was announced that the Marianas Southern Airways division of the airline was withdrawing from the CNMI, citing "unwillingness of Governor Arnold Palacios to honor the contract signed by the previous administration".

In July 2023, Surf Air Mobility, the parent company of Southern Airways Express, went public on the stock market through a direct listing on the New York Stock Exchange (under the ticker symbol "SRFM").

== Destinations ==
=== Interline agreements ===
Southern Airways Express has interline agreements with Alaska Airlines, American Airlines, and United Airlines which provides passengers through-ticketing and baggage transfers.

=== CampusConnection ===
Southern provides an extra discount at select colleges/universities that participate in the Campus Connection program for students, faculty, and parents.

== Fleet ==
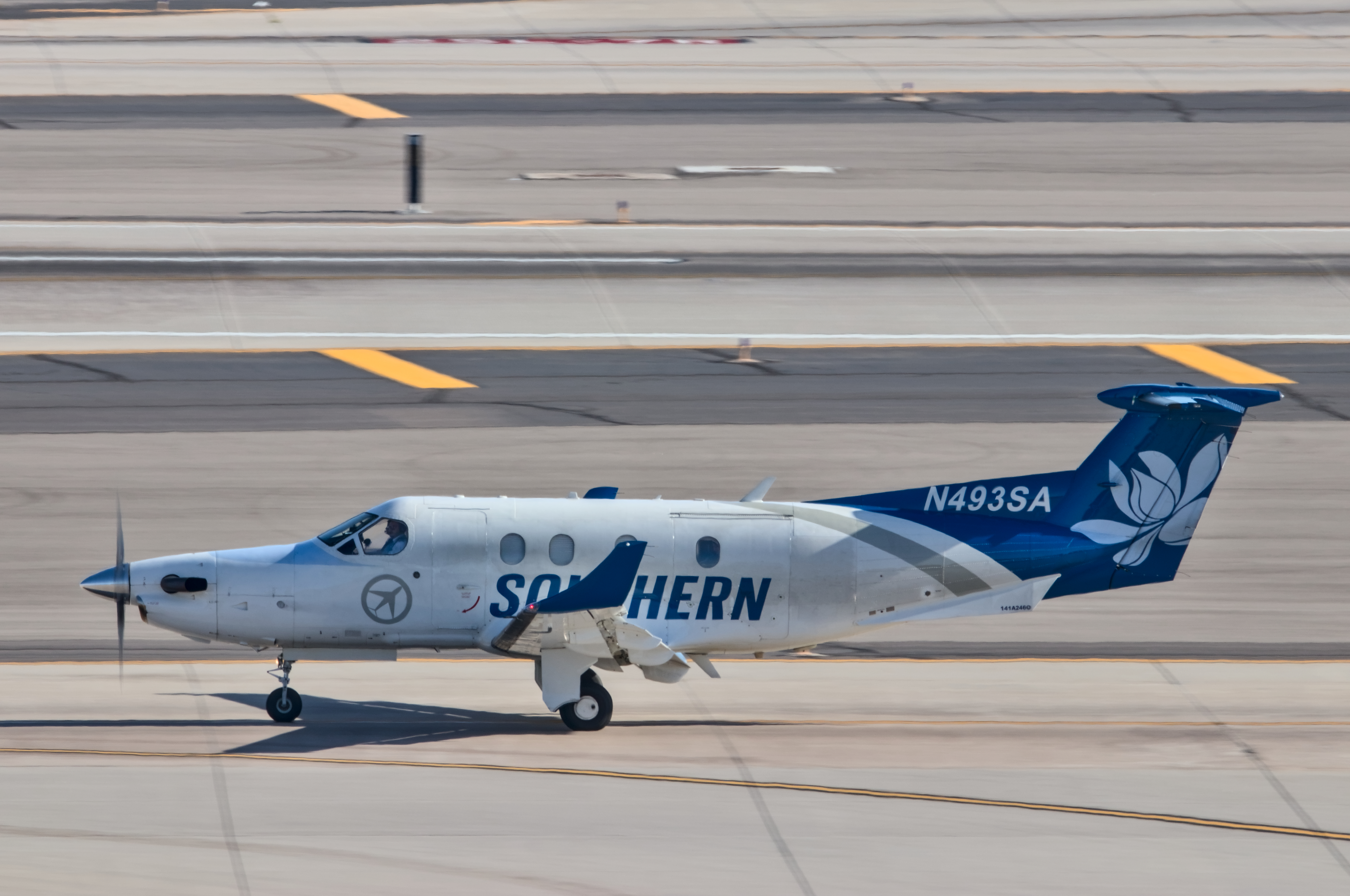
Southern Airways Express PC12 in Phoenix

Southern Airways Express operates the following aircraft:

| Type | Fleet | Orders | Passengers | Notes |
|---|---|---|---|---|
| Cessna 208 Caravan | 38 | 94 | 9 | New Caravan delivers began in December 2025 |
| Regent Monarch | — | 5 | 100 | Electric ground-effect vehicles |
| REGENT Viceroy | — | 15 | 12 | Electric ground-effect vehicles |
| Total | 38 | 114 | | |
