= 2013 Makani Kai Air Cessna 208 crash =

2013 aviation incident in Hawaii

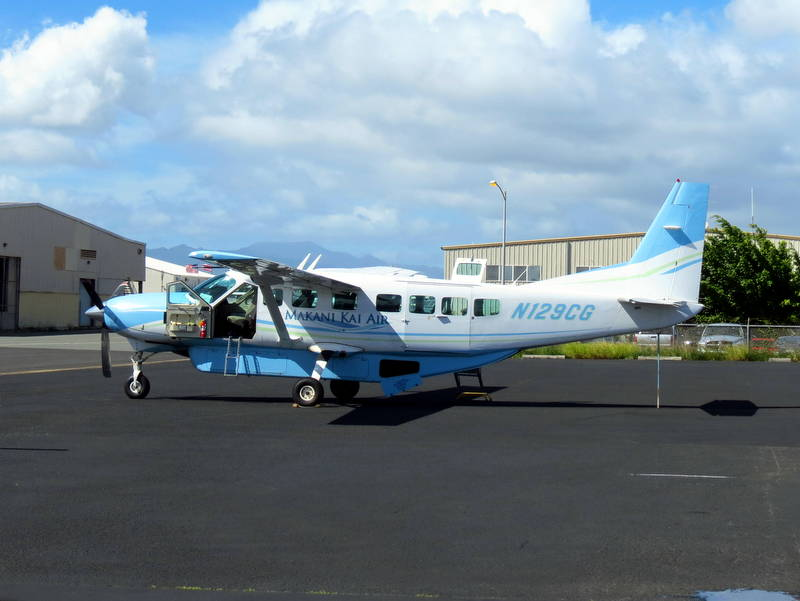
- A Makani Kai Air Cessna 208B Grand Caravan similar to the one involved

Accident
- Date: December 11, 2013
- Summary: Ditching after engine failure
- Site: North Pacific Ocean; 1km of Kalaupapa, Hawaii

Aircraft
- Aircraft type: Cessna 208B Grand Caravan
- Operator: Makani Kai Air
- Registration: N687MA
- Flight origin: Kalaupapa Airport, Kalaupapa, Hawaii
- Destination: Daniel K. Inouye International Airport, Honolulu, Hawaii
- Occupants: 10
- Passengers: 9
- Crew: 1
- Fatalities: 1
- Injuries: 4
- Survivors: 9

On December 11, 2013, about 15:22 Hawaiian standard time, a Makani Kai Air Cessna 208B, registration N687MA, ditched into the Pacific Ocean following an engine failure near Kalaupapa, Hawaii. One passenger was fatally injured, while the other 9 occupants sustained injuries, with the pilot and two passengers suffering serious injuries. The investigation found that the turbine blades had fractured inside the engine, leading to their failure and the subsequent ditching.

== Aircraft and crew ==
The aircraft involved was a Cessna 208B Grand Canyon, registration N687MA (serial no. 208B1002), built in 2002. It was powered by a Pratt & Whitney turboprop engine and had accumulated a total of 4,886 flight hours. The occupants consisted of a sole pilot (age 60) and nine passengers, among them was Director of the Hawaii Department of Health (concurrently mayor of Kalawao County, Hawaii) and social worker Loretta Fuddy.

== Accident ==
The plane was flying from Kalaupapa to Honolulu in a Cessna 208 operated by Makani Kai Air. There were 10 occupants on board, including Director of the Hawaii Department of Health (concurrently mayor of Kalawao County) and social worker Loretta Fuddy. Shortly after takeoff, while passing through 500 feet, a loud bang was heard as the captain reduced power for the climb. This was followed by an immediate loss in engine power. The captain issued a Mayday call to air traffic control and realized that making it to the runway was all but impossible. The captain decided to ditch the aircraft in the Pacific Ocean. On impact, the passengers and pilot exited the plane through breaks in the fuselage; however, passenger Loretta Fuddy died as a result of cardiac arrythmia caused by hyperventilation due to the frigid water of the Pacific. There were no signs of blunt force trauma. The remaining passengers and the pilot suffered either minor or severe injuries. The aircraft sank to the bottom of the ocean and was written off. One of the passengers, Ferdinand Puentes managed to take a selfie during the crash.

== Investigation ==
The National Transportation Safety Board (NTSB) opened an investigation into the accident. The investigation found that the aircraft had suffered an engine failure due to abnormalities in the structural integrity of the turbine compressor blades. Maintenance done on the aircraft one and a half years earlier revealed no evidence in the logbook that a turbine compressor blade inspection had been carried out. The new policies in the Maintenance on Reliable Engines (MORE) Supplemental Type Certificate (STC) inspection program were found to be "confusing" with the MORE inspection program being a supplement (or used in combination with) the engine manufacturer's Instructions for Continued Airworthiness manual which caused confusion on part of the operator who decided that a compressor blade inspection was not needed. The turbine compressor blade evaluation was also contained in the engine manufacturer service bulletin (SB) but was not implemented into the MORE inspection program. Had it been implemented, a fault in the engine could have been detected and the accident prevented. Several features of the aircraft contributed to the severity of the accident. The absence of a safety briefing prior to takeoff resulted in the passengers unaware of what to do in the event of an emergency with some passengers stating that the captain told them "they knew the procedures". The inadequate number and type of life jackets contributed to the death of Loretta Fuddy who mistakenly chose an infant life jacket instead of an adult life jacket, resulting in her drowning.

The final report issued by the NTSB stated that the probable cause of the accident was the failure of the turbine blades, leading to the engine failing and the resulting ditching. The source of the failure could not be determined due to the extensive heat damage suffered when the engine failed.
