= Makani Kai Air =

Hawaii airline

- Founded: 1998; 28 years ago
- Ceased operations: December 2020; 5 years ago (merged into Mokulele Airlines)
- AOC #: MKHA108K
- Hubs: Honolulu
- Subsidiaries: Magnum Helicopters; Hawaii Aviation Services
- Fleet size: 13
- Destinations: 6
- Headquarters: Honolulu, Hawaii
- Key people: Richard Schuman (Owner); Diane Schuman (CFO)
- Employees: 40

Makani Kai Air, was an FAA Part 135 scheduled air carrier based in Honolulu, Hawaii. It was a subsidiary of Schuman Aviation Company as well as Mokulele Airlines.

== Overview ==
The airline offered regularly scheduled passenger service between Honolulu International Airport, Hoolehua Airport, Molokai, Kalaupapa Airport, Molokai, Kahului, Maui and Princeville Airport, Kauai. The scheduled service between Kalaupapa to Hoolehua Airport was among the shortest scheduled flights in the world.

Schuman Aviation Company, Ltd., also offers charter airplane and helicopter services statewide. Another subsidiary, Magnum Helicopters, offers doors-off tours of the island of Oahu.

Makani Kai Air began operations in 1998. It began regularly scheduled passenger service between Honolulu and Kalaupapa in 2009. In 2011, Makani Kai won the Essential Air Service contract for Kalaupapa and commenced service under the contract in January 2012. In June 2013, Makani Kai began regular daily service to "topside" Molokai at the Hoolehua Airport. On May 1, 2019, Makani Kai Air began twice-daily service between Honolulu International Airport and Princeville Airport on Kauai. On August 1, 2019, Makani Kai Air began air service between Kahului, Maui, and Kailua-Kona on the Big Island of Hawaii.

On June 3, 2020, Makani Kai announced it would be merging with Mokulele Airlines, another commuter airline operating in Hawaii, with the new airline operating under the Mokulele brand. Makani Kai owner Richard Schuman oversees the combined airline. Schuman Aviation Company's other subsidiaries, Magnum Helicopters, and Hawaii Aviation Services are not part of the merger.

== Destinations ==
Makanai Kai Air served the following destinations prior to the merger:

Island	City	Airport
Hawaii	Kailua-Kona	Kona International Airport
Maui	Kahului	Kahului Airport
Molokai	Hoʻolehua	Molokai Airport
Molokai	Kalaupapa	Kalaupapa Airport
Oahu	Honolulu	Honolulu International Airport
Kauai	Princeville	Princeville Airport

== Fleet ==
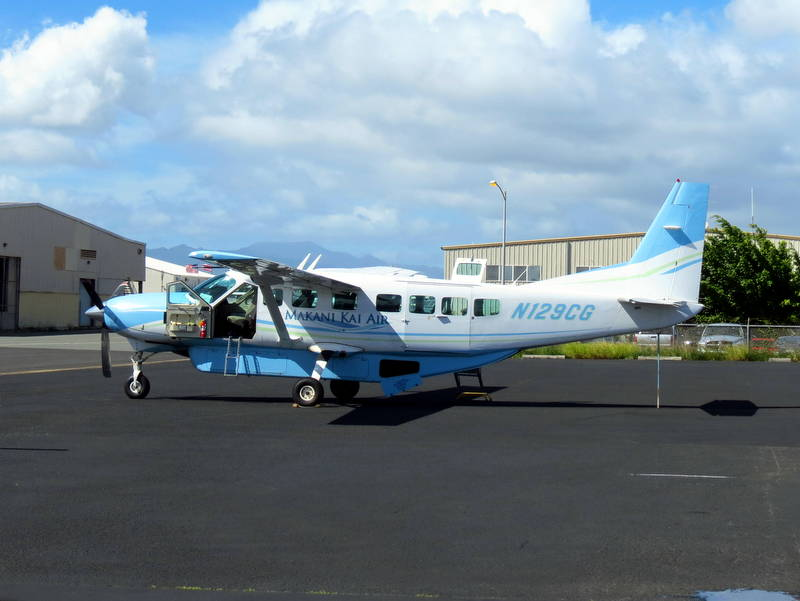
Makani Kai Air Cessna 208 at Honolulu International Airport

Aircraft	In Fleet	Passengers
Eurocopter AS350B2	1	4-6
Cessna Grand Caravan	6	8
Beechcraft King Air 300	5	5-7
Piper PA-31	1	7
Total	13	

== Accidents and incidents ==
December 11, 2013	A Cessna 208 Caravan operating a Makani Kai Air flight to Honolulu, Hawaii ditched into the ocean a mile off Kalaupapa, Hawaii after suffering an engine failure shortly after takeoff. One occupant, American social worker and politician Loretta Fuddy, was killed in the accident.
