= Kalaupapa Airport =

Airport in Hawaii, United States

Kalaupapa Airport Kahua Mokulele o Kalaupapa
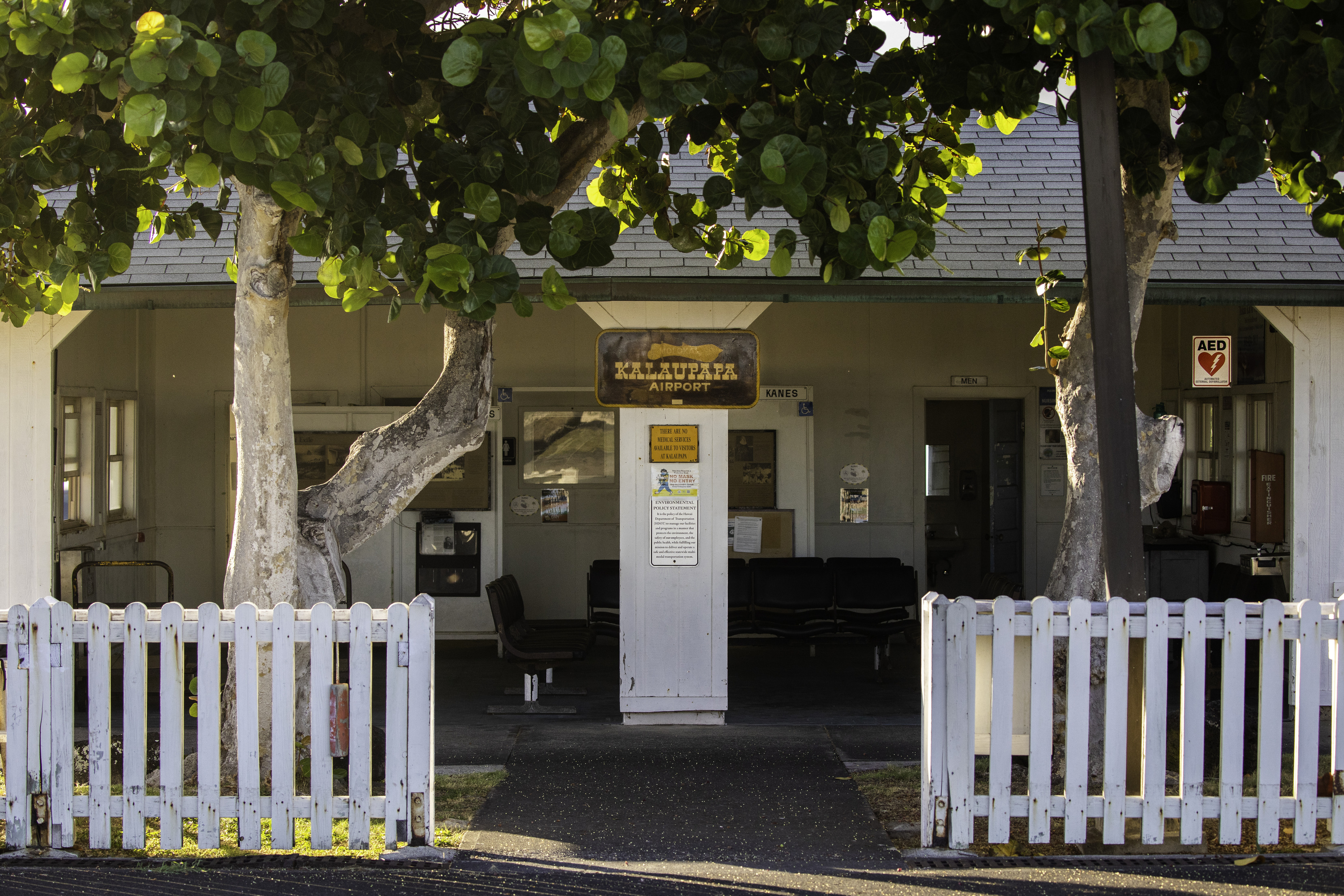
- Airport terminal
- IATA: LUP; ICAO: PHLU; FAA LID: LUP

Summary
- Airport type: Public
- Owner/Operator: Hawaii Department of Transportation
- Serves: Kalaupapa, Hawaii
- Elevation AMSL: 24 ft (7.3 m)
- Coordinates: 21°12′40″N 156°58′25″W
- Website: hawaii.gov/lup

Map
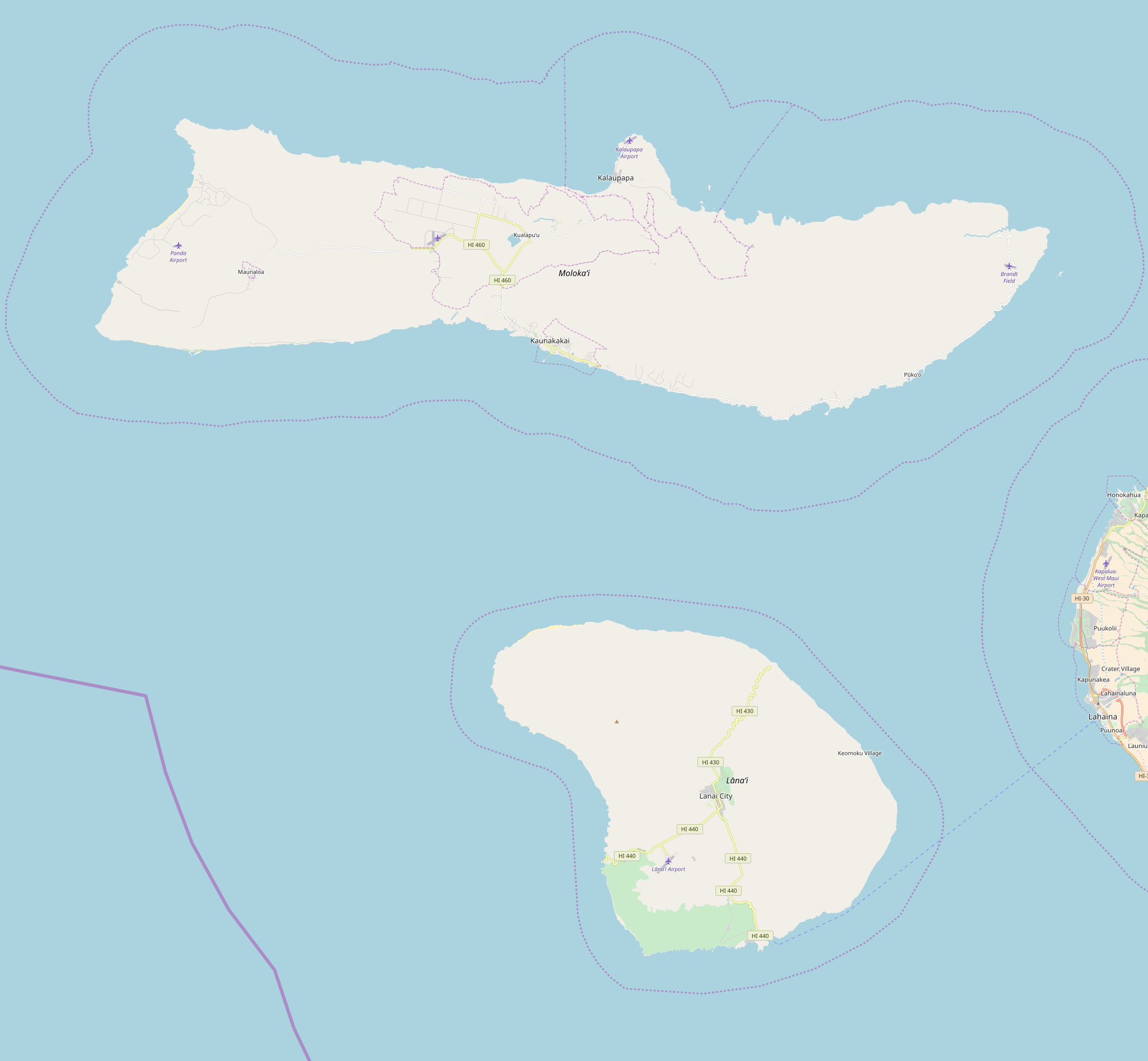
- Location of airport in Hawaii LUP (Hawaii)

Runways
Direction	Length		Surface
Direction	ft	m	Surface
5/23	2,700	823	Asphalt

Statistics
- Aircraft operations (2016): 3,294
- Departing passengers (12 mos. ending January 2022): 2,570
- Source: Federal Aviation Administration

Kalaupapa Airport (IATA: LUP, ICAO: PHLU, FAA LID: LUP) is a regional public use airport of the U.S. state of Hawaii, located on the northern peninsula of the island of Molokaʻi, two nautical miles (2.3 mi; 3.7 km) north of Kalaupapa Settlement, in Kalawao County. Most flights to Kalaupapa originate from Molokai Airport or from airports on the other Hawaiian islands by unscheduled air taxis and general aviation. It is also used as a cargo facility carrying goods for Kalaupapa, which has no road access from the rest of Molokai.

The airport offered scheduled passenger service from Makani Kai Air, which began providing scheduled passenger service in January 2012, using two nine-seat Cessna Grand Caravans. This service was subsidized by the Essential Air Service (EAS) program until May 2018. Previously, Pacific Wings had provided scheduled passenger service at Kalaupapa; this was subsidized by the EAS program from 2000 until April 2007, when Pacific Wings began providing subsidy-free service. Pacific Wings ceased operations in Hawaii in 2013.

The scheduled service from Kalaupapa to Molokai Airport was among the shortest flights in the world.

It is included in the Federal Aviation Administration (FAA) National Plan of Integrated Airport Systems for 2021–2025, in which it is categorized as a non-primary commercial service facility.

== Facilities and aircraft ==
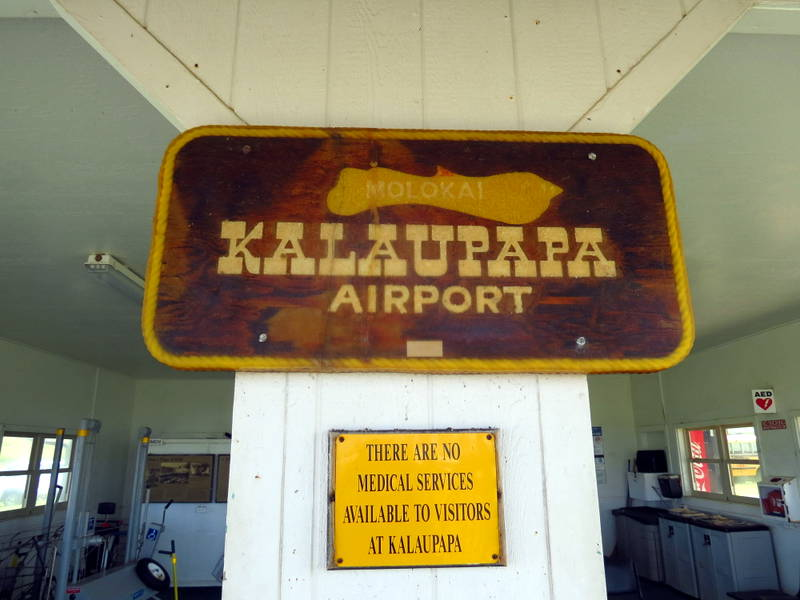
Kalaupapa Airport terminal

Kalaupapa Airport covers an area of 55 acres (22 ha) at an elevation of 24 feet (7 m) above mean sea level. It has one runway designated 5/23 with an asphalt surface measuring 2,700 by 75 feet (823 x 23 m).

Facilities include a small passenger terminal and airport support areas. The airport does not have a control tower. To comply with the wishes of the community and to minimize disturbance to the surrounding Kalaupapa National Historical Park, no significant improvements are planned.

For the 12-month period ending December 31, 2016, the airport had 3,294 aircraft operations, an average of 9 per day: 73% air taxi, 18% general aviation and 9% military. In April 2022, there were no aircraft based at this airport.

== Airline and destinations ==
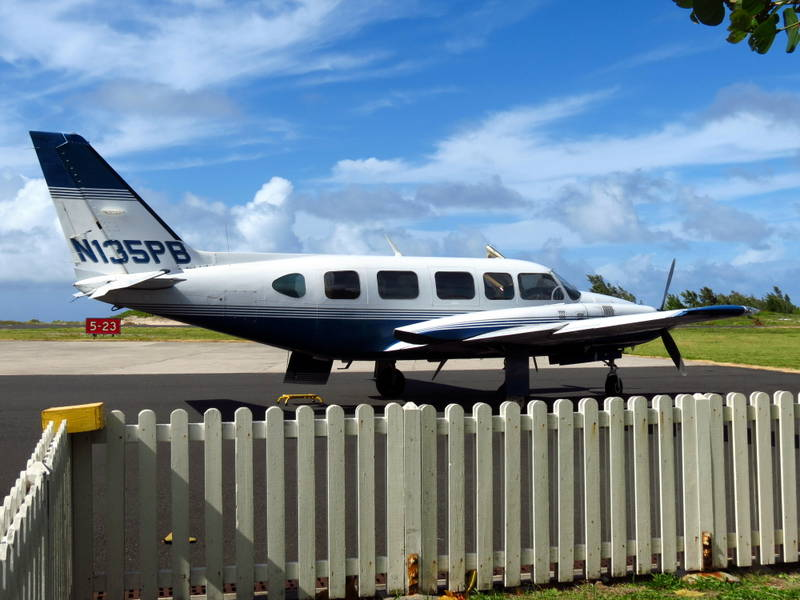
Piper PA-31-350 Chieftain at the airport in 2015

Mokulele Airlines connects Kalaupapa Airport to Honolulu International Airport and Molokai Airport.

== Statistics ==
Carrier shares: (August 2024 – July 2025)
Carrier	Passengers (arriving and departing)
Mokulele Airlines	9,040(100%)

Top domestic destinations (August 2024 – July 2025)
Rank	Airport	Passengers
1	Ho'olehua-Molokai Airport (MKK)	2,090
2	Honolulu International (HNL)	1,930

== Authority ==
Kalaupapa Airport is part of a centralized state structure governing all of the airports and seaports of Hawaii. The official authority of Kalaupapa Airport is the Governor of Hawaii. The governor appoints the Director of the Hawaii State Department of Transportation who has jurisdiction over the Hawaii Airports Administrator.

The Hawaii Airports Administrator oversees six governing bodies: Airports Operations Office, Airports Planning Office, Engineering Branch, Information Technology Office, Staff Services Office, Visitor Information Program Office. Collectively, the six bodies have authority over the four airport districts in Hawaii: Hawaiʻi District, Kauaʻi District, Maui District and the principal Oʻahu District. Kalaupapa Airport is a subordinate of the Maui District officials.

== Incidents ==
On December 11, 2013, a Makani Kai Air Cessna Grand Caravan bound for Honolulu crashed into the ocean shortly after taking off from Kalauapapa. One passenger, Hawaii State Health Department head Loretta Fuddy, died as a result; the other seven passengers and the pilot survived.

== See also ==
- List of airports in Hawaii

== Other sources ==
- Essential Air Service documents (Docket DOT-OST-2000-6773) from the U.S. Department of Transportation:
  - Order 2002-8-10 (August 12, 2002): selecting Pacific Wings, Inc., to continue to provide subsidized EAS at Hana, Kalaupapa and Kamuela, Hawaii, for an additional two-year period, beginning when it inaugurates service with 9-seat Cessna Caravan aircraft. Annual subsidy rates are $1,048,555 for Hana; $514,093 for Kalaupapa; and $781,270 for Kamuela for the first year; the second-year rates are approximately ten percent lower.
  - Order 2005-3-34 (March 24, 2005): re-selecting Pacific Wings Airlines to provide essential air service (EAS) at Hana, Kalaupapa, and Kamuela, Hawaii, for the period from April 1, 2005, through March 31, 2007, at an annual rate of $1,597,422 for the first year and at an annual rate of $1,501,752 for the second year.
  - Order 2006-12-3 (December 4, 2006): terminating the carrier-selection proceeding for Essential Air Service at Hana, Kalaupapa, and Kamuela, Hawaii. The incumbent EAS carrier, Pacific Wings, has proposed to continue to provide all three communities' EAS on a subsidy-free basis beginning April 1, 2007.
  - Ninety-Day Notice (December 6, 2010): from Pacific Wings L.L.C. of intent to terminate service at Kalaupapa in order to trigger an EAS Request for proposal.
  - Order 2010-12-30 (December 23, 2010): prohibiting Pacific Wings L.L.C. from suspending service at Kalaupapa, Hawaii, and requesting proposals from carriers interested in providing essential air service (EAS) at the community for a two-year period, with or without subsidy.
  - Notice (January 25, 2011): from Pacific Wings withdrawing its notice of intent to claim EAS subsidy at Kalaupapa, Hawaii. Pacific Wings will continue to provide the current level of service to Kalaupapa without subsidy.
  - Order 2011-4-7 (April 6, 2011): requesting a second round of proposals from carriers interested in providing Essential Air Service (EAS) at Kalaupapa, Hawaii, for a two-year period, with or without subsidy
  - Order 2011-11-27 (November 22, 2011): selects Schuman Aviation Company Ltd. d/b/a Makani Kai Air Charters to provide subsidized Essential Air Service (EAS) with nine-seat Cessna Grand Caravans at Kalaupapa, Hawaii, for the two-year period beginning when the carrier begins full EAS, for a first-year subsidy rate of $932,772, and a second-year subsidy rate of $923,509.
  - Order 2014-6-12 (June 19, 2014): re-selects Schuman Aviation Company Ltd. d/b/a Makani Kai Charters to provide subsidized Essential Air Service (EAS) with nine-seat Cessna Grand Caravan, or nine-seat Piper Chieftain aircraft, at Kalaupapa, Hawaii, for the four-year period from June 1, 2014, through May 31, 2018. That service will continue the current service of 12 nonstop round trips a week to Honolulu, and 18 nonstop round trips a week to Molokai. The first-year subsidy rate will be $751,040, the second year subsidy rate will be $730,848, the third year subsidy rate will be $710,656, and the fourth year subsidy rate will be $690,463.
