= Kalawao County, Hawaii =

County in Hawaii, United States

- County of Hawaii
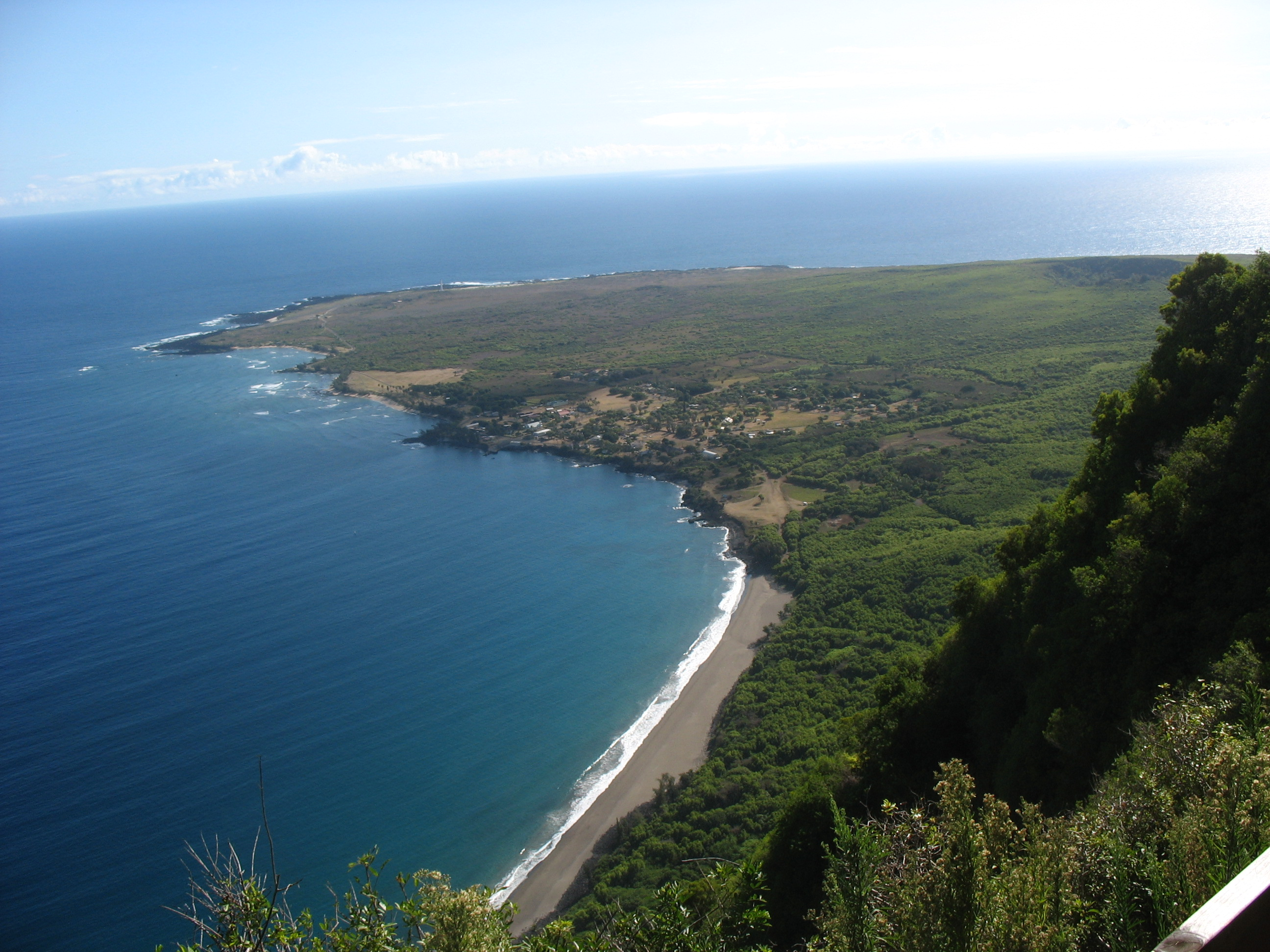
- Kalaupapa peninsula

- Location within the U.S. state of Hawaii
- Interactive map of Kalawao County, Hawaii
- Coordinates: 21°11′49″N 156°58′02″W
- Country: United States
- State: Hawaii
- Founded: 1905
- Named for: Kalawao
- Seat: none (administered by Hawaii Dept. of Health)
- Largest community: Kalaupapa

Area
  - Total: 53 sq mi (140 km^{2})
  - Land: 12 sq mi (31 km^{2})
  - Water: 41 sq mi (110 km^{2}) 77.3%

Population (2020)
  - Total: 82
  - Estimate (2025): 82
  - Density: 6.8/sq mi (2.6/km^{2})
- Time zone: UTC−10 (Hawaii–Aleutian)
- Congressional district: 2nd

Kalawao County (Hawaiian: Kalana o Kalawao) is a county in the U.S. state of Hawaii. It is the smallest county in the 50 states by land area and the second-smallest county by population, after Loving County, Texas. The county encompasses the peninsula on the north coast of the island of Molokaʻi. The peninsula was developed and used from 1866 to 1969 as a leper colony, chosen because it is isolated from the rest of Molokaʻi by cliffs over a quarter-mile high; the only land access is a mule trail.

Due to the small population (82 as of the 2020 United States census), Kalawao County does not have the same functions as other Hawaii counties. Instead, it operates as a judicial district of Maui County, which includes the rest of the island of Molokaʻi. The county has no elected government.

The United States Census Bureau counts Kalawao County as what it calls "an adjunct of the state government".

== History ==
The Kingdom of Hawaiʻi, the Republic of Hawaiʻi, the Territory of Hawaii, and the state of Hawaii all exiled persons suffering from Hansen's disease (leprosy) to the peninsula, from 1866 to 1969. The quarantine policy was only lifted after effective antibiotic treatments were developed that could be administered on an outpatient basis and patients could be rendered non-contagious.

Many residents chose to remain in their familiar community on the peninsula. The state promised that they could live there for the rest of their lives. As of 2015, the population consisted of the remaining patients, plus state employees and park staff. Tourists 16 years of age and older and personal guests of residents may visit with prior government permission, and the general public must be part of an official tour.

In 1980, the Kalaupapa National Historical Park was established to preserve the county's history and environment.

A Hawaii state law passed in 2026 provides that Kalawao County will cease to exist one year after the death of the last full- or part-time patient resident of Kalaupapa, and its area will then become part of Maui County. A preface to the law noted that, at the time of passage, there were four full-time and three part-time patient residents, the youngest of whom was then 83 years old.

== Government ==
Kalawao County lacks a local, county government. Instead, Kalawao County is administered by the Hawaii Department of Health because of the history of the settlement and current patients living there. Under Hawaii state law, the Director of the Hawaii Department of Health, who is appointed by the Governor, also serves as the Mayor of Kalawao County. The Mayor holds executive powers within the county; the mayor also appoints a county sheriff, who is selected from local residents. The only county statutes that apply to Kalawao County directly are those on matters of health.

Former Kalawao County Mayor (and State Health Director) Bruce Anderson enacted a smoking ban in all Kalawao County public buildings on October 4, 2002.

Former Hawaii Health Director and Kalawao Mayor Loretta Fuddy, who had served in both offices from 2011 to 2013, died in a plane crash on December 11, 2013, shortly after takeoff from Kalaupapa Airport. Fuddy had traveled to Kalawao County earlier in the day to attend an annual meeting with the county's Hansen's disease patients as part of her duties as mayor.

Kalawao is part of the First Judicial Circuit, which includes the entire island of Oʻahu. For the purpose of notarization, the designated venue for the First Judicial Circuit is "State of Hawaii, City and County of Honolulu."

The U.S. Census Bureau does not count Kalawao County as its own county government and instead considers it a dependency of the Hawaii state government.

== Geography ==
According to the U.S. Census Bureau, the county has a total area of 53 square miles (140 km^{2}), comprising 12 square miles (31 km^{2}) of land and 41 square miles (110 km^{2}) (77.3%) of water. By land area, it is the smallest true county in the United States; some independent cities in Virginia are smaller and are sometimes considered to be "county equivalents" for statistical purposes such as with the US Census Bureau.

=== Territory ===
Kalawao County occupies the Kalaupapa Peninsula. The county also holds a shield volcano, formed by erosion of a larger volcano. Its only city lies on 21 degrees, 11 minutes, and 49 seconds north; and 156 degrees, 58 minutes, and 2 seconds west.

=== Climate ===
Kalawao County features a tropical climate.

=== Kalaupapa Peninsula ===
Kalaupapa Peninsula contains the county's only settlement, Kalaupapa. The Kalaupapa Peninsula developed from lava that erupted from the ocean floor near Kauhakō Crater and spread outward, forming a low shield volcano. This was the most recent volcanic episode on the island and of the larger East Molokaʻi shield volcano, occurring after the formation of the cliffs by erosion.

=== Subdivisions ===
Kalawao County is composed of four ahupuaʻa. From west to east:

Ahupuaʻa	Area mi^{2}	Area km^{2}	Pop.	Description
Kalaupapa	2.079	5.385	65	West side of Kalaupapa peninsula. Includes a section of Molokaʻi's coast further west
Makanalua	3.229	8.363	8	Strip of land in the center of the peninsula that runs to its northern tip. Includes Kalaupapa Airport.
Kalawao	3.294	8.531	9	Eastern coast of Kalaupapa peninsula and Waialeia Valley to the southeast
Waikolu	5.544	14.359	0	Includes namesake valley. Uninhabited.
Kalawao County	14.146	36.638	82	

== Demographics ==
Historical population
Census	Pop.	Note	%±
1900	1,177		—
1910	785		−33.3%
1920	667		−15.0%
1930	605		−9.3%
1940	446		−26.3%
1950	340		−23.8%
1960	279		−17.9%
1970	172		−38.4%
1980	144		−16.3%
1990	130		−9.7%
2000	147		13.1%
2010	90		−38.8%
2020	82		−8.9%
2025 (est.)	82	Steady	0.0%
U.S. Decennial Census; 1790–1960 1900–1990; 1990–2000 2010–2020

=== 2020 census ===
As of the 2020 census, the county had a population of 82. Of the residents, 12.2% were under the age of 18 and 23.2% were 65 years of age or older; the median age was 50.3 years. For every 100 females there were 82.2 males, and for every 100 females age 18 and over there were 84.6 males. 0.0% of residents lived in urban areas and 100.0% lived in rural areas.

Kalawao County, Hawaii – Racial and ethnic composition Note: the US Census treats Hispanic/Latino as an ethnic category. This table excludes Latinos from the racial categories and assigns them to a separate category. Hispanics/Latinos may be of any race.
Race / Ethnicity (NH = Non-Hispanic)	Pop 2000	Pop 2010	Pop 2020	% 2000	% 2010	% 2020
White alone (NH)	33	24	27	22.45%	26.67%	32.93%
Black or African American alone (NH)	0	0	0	0.00%	0.00%	0.00%
Native American or Alaska Native alone (NH)	0	0	0	0.00%	0.00%	0.00%
Asian alone (NH)	25	7	9	17.01%	7.78%	10.98%
Native Hawaiian or Pacific Islander alone (NH)	71	44	15	48.30%	48.89%	18.29%
Other race alone (NH)	3	0	4	2.04%	0.00%	4.88%
Mixed race or Multiracial (NH)	9	14	9	6.12%	15.56%	10.98%
Hispanic or Latino (any race)	6	1	18	4.08%	1.11%	21.95%
Total	147	90	82	100.00%	100.00%	100.00%

The racial makeup of the county was 32.9% White, 2.4% Black or African American, 0.0% American Indian and Alaska Native, 14.6% Asian, 18.3% Native Hawaiian and Pacific Islander, 4.9% from some other race, and 26.8% from two or more races. Hispanic or Latino residents of any race comprised 22.0% of the population.

There were 59 households in the county, of which 25.4% had children under the age of 18 living with them and 47.5% had a female householder with no spouse or partner present. About 69.5% of all households were made up of individuals and 22.1% had someone living alone who was 65 years of age or older.

There were 114 housing units, of which 48.2% were vacant. Among occupied housing units, 3.4% were owner-occupied and 96.6% were renter-occupied. The homeowner vacancy rate was 33.3% and the rental vacancy rate was 6.3%.

=== 2000 census ===
As of the census of 2000, 147 people, 115 households, and 21 families resided in the county, declining to 90 inhabitants in 2010. The population density was 11 people per square mile (4.2 people/km^{2}). The 172 housing units produced an average density of 13 per square mile (5.0/km^{2}). The racial makeup of the county was 48% Pacific Islander, 26% White, 17% Asian, 3% from other races, and 6% from two or more races. Hispanic or Latino of any race made up 4%. Kalawao County has the highest Pacific Islander population percentage of any U.S. county, and is the only county where they make up a plurality.

2% of households housed children under the age of 18. 17% were married couples living together. 3% had a female householder with no husband present. 81% were non-families. 79% of all households were made up of individuals, and 31% had someone living alone who was 65 years of age or older. The average household size was 1.28 and the average family size was 2.27.

2% of residents were under the age of 18, 1% from 18 to 24, 18% from 25 to 44, 46% from 45 to 64, and 32% who were 65 years of age or older. The median age was 59 years. For every 100 females, there were 98.6 males. The population has declined since 1900:

Current residents include 16 former patients, 40 federal employees who work on preservation projects, and some state-employed health workers.

== Transportation ==
The only access to Kalawao County is by air, or by a steep mule trail that descends 1,600 ft (490 m) from the rest of Molokaʻi, closed to visitors since a landslide in 2018. Kalaupapa Airport has scheduled air service to Molokaʻi Airport and to Honolulu Airport.

Freight is delivered to the county once a year, usually in July, by barge.

== Politics ==
United States presidential election results for Kalawao County, Hawaii
Year	Republican		Democratic		Third party(ies)	
Year	No.	%	No.	%	No.	%
1992	24	32.00%	48	64.00%	3	4.00%
1996	13	20.63%	46	73.02%	4	6.35%
2000	11	24.44%	30	66.67%	4	8.89%
2004	14	35.00%	26	65.00%	0	0.00%
2008	6	19.35%	24	77.42%	1	3.23%
2012	2	7.41%	25	92.59%	0	0.00%
2016	1	5.00%	14	70.00%	5	25.00%
2020	1	4.17%	23	95.83%	0	0.00%
2024	3	16.67%	15	83.33%	0	0.00%

Like the rest of the state, Kalawao County is a stronghold for the Democratic Party. It was the only county in the United States where the Republican candidate in the 2016 United States presidential election, Donald Trump, finished in third by only getting one vote; 70% of Kalawao's voters chose Democratic nominee Hillary Clinton, and 25% of Kalawao voters cast their ballots for Green Party candidate Jill Stein, making it Stein's strongest county nationwide in terms of vote percentage. In 2020 Joe Biden improved on Clinton's 2016 performance by over 25% as the Greens declined to zero votes, giving Biden 96% of the vote, which was his strongest performance in any county in the United States. This is one of four counties, along with Jim Hogg County, Texas, Brooks County, Texas, and Menominee County, Wisconsin, that have never voted Republican.

Kalawao County was the only county in the state to vote against 2024 Hawaii Amendment 1, which repealed a state constitutional amendment that allowed Hawaii's legislature to outlaw same-sex marriage.

== Education ==
The county is within the Hawaii Department of Education school district.
