= Princeville Airport =

Princeville Airport Kahua Mokulele o Princeville
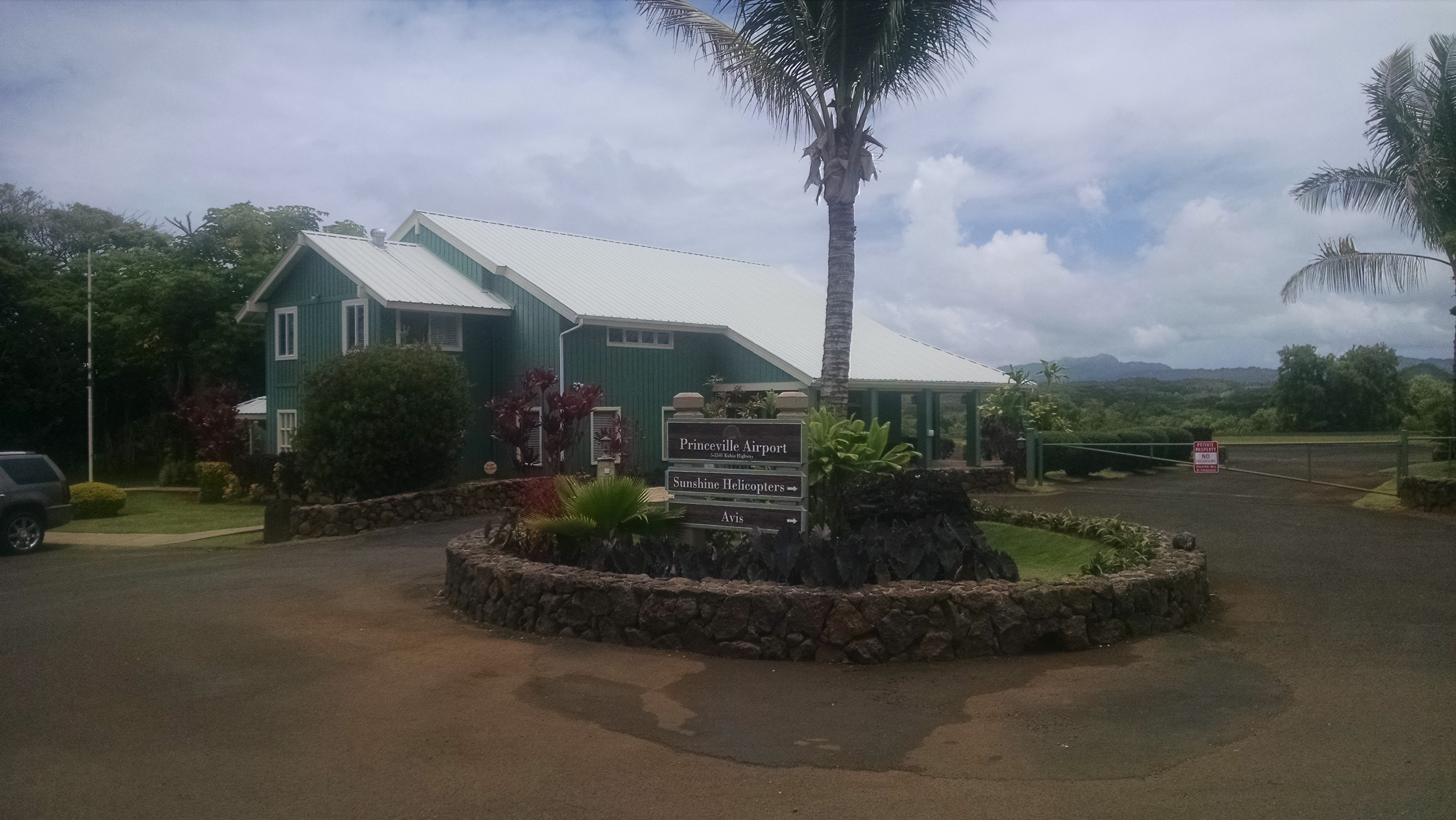
- Princeville airport entrance
- IATA: HPV; ICAO: none; FAA LID: HI01

Summary
- Airport type: Private
- Operator: Princeville Corp.
- Location: Hanalei, Hawaii
- Elevation AMSL: 344 ft / 105 m
- Coordinates: 22°12′33″N 159°26′44″W

Map

Runways
| Direction | Length | | Surface |
| Direction | ft | m | Surface |
|---|---|---|---|
| 5/23 | 3,560 | 1,085 | Asphalt |

Statistics (ending December 31, 2002)
- Operations: 7,300
- Based aircraft: 2
- Source: Federal Aviation Administration

Princeville Airport (IATA: HPV, FAA LID: HI01) is a private airport located 3 nautical miles (5.6 km; 3.5 mi) east of the central business district (CBD) of Hanalei, a village on the island of Kaua‘i in Hawaii, United States. The airport covers 29 acres (12 ha) and has one runway.

== History ==
Princeville Airport opened for operations in 1977. Shortly thereafter Princeville Airways began scheduled services on September 9, 1980, between Honolulu and Princeville, Kauai using two de Havilland Canada DHC-6 Twin Otter STOL capable turboprop aircraft. It served this initial regular commuter route between Princeville and Honolulu primarily for Princeville Resort guests.

The State of Hawaii in 1994 entered into an agreement with the owners of the airport to take over operations and management. In 1996 the Session Laws of Hawaii created Act 287 to appropriate $100,000 for a design to widen Runway 5-23. The State dropped the airport lease in 1999.

On May 1, 2019, Makani Kai Air began twice daily service between Honolulu International Airport and Princeville Airport on Kauai. The airport had been without commercial airline service for more than 20 years after the departure of Island Air in 1997. Since the merger with Mokulele Airlines, commercial flights from Princeville are no longer offered.

As of April 24th, 2023 the only operator at the Princeville Airport is Blue Hawaiian Helicopters, which offers tours of the Island of Kaua'i.

== Previous airline service ==
- Island Air (Honolulu)
- Makani Kai Air (Honolulu)

== See also ==
- List of airports in Hawaii
