= Makanalua, Hawaii =

Unincorporated community in Hawaii, US

Makanalua
- Unincorporated community
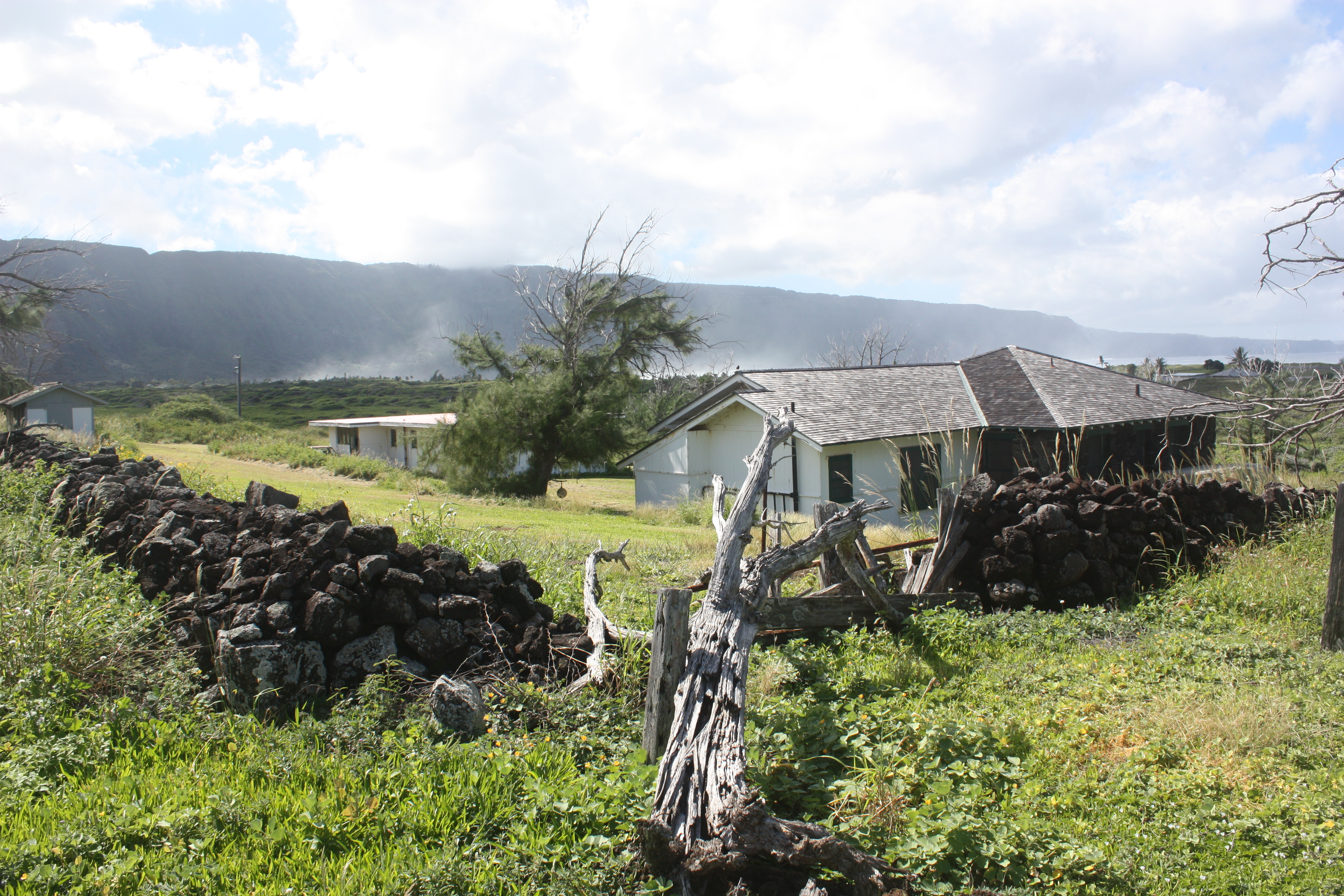
- Lighthouse keepers' residence

- Location within Hawaii
- Coordinates: 21°11′33″N 156°58′19″W
- Country: United States
- State: Hawaii
- County: Kalawao

Area
  - Land: 3.229 sq mi (8.363 km^{2})
- Elevation: 128 ft (39 m)

Population (2001)
  - Total: 8
- Time zone: UTC-10 (Hawaii-Aleutian)
- Area code: 808
- GNIS feature ID: 362068

Makanalua is an unincorporated community and ahupuaʻa in Kalawao County, Hawaii, United States. During the Great Māhele of 1848, the land was retained for Princess Kekauʻōnohi. The name means "double gift" in the Hawaiian language.
