= List of airports in Hawaii =

This is a list of airports in Hawaii (a U.S. state), grouped by type and sorted by location. It contains all public-use and military airports in the state. Some private-use and former airports may be included where notable, such as airports that were previously public-use, those with commercial enplanements recorded by the FAA or airports assigned an IATA airport code.

== Airports ==
This list contains the following information:

- **City served** – The city generally associated with the airport, as per the airport's master record with the Federal Aviation Administration. This is not always the actual location since some airports are located in smaller towns outside of the city they serve. It is not meant to be a complete list of cities served, which can be found in or added to each airport's Wikipedia article.
- **FAA** – The location identifier assigned by the Federal Aviation Administration (FAA). These are linked to each airport's page at the Hawaii Department of Transportation.
- **IATA** – The airport code assigned by the International Air Transport Association (IATA). Those that do not match the FAA code are shown in bold.
- **ICAO** – The location indicator assigned by the International Civil Aviation Organization (ICAO).
- **Airport name** – The official airport name. Those shown in **bold** indicate the airport has scheduled passenger service on commercial airlines.
- **Role** – One of four FAA airport categories, as per the 2021–2025 National Plan of Integrated Airport Systems (NPIAS) report released September 2020:
  - P-s: Commercial service – primary are publicly owned airports that receive scheduled passenger service and have more than 10,000 passenger boardings (enplanements) each year. Each primary airport is sub-classified by the FAA as one of the following four "hub" types (s):
    - L: Large hub that accounts for at least 1% of total U.S. passenger enplanements.
    - M: Medium hub that accounts for between 0.25% and 1% of total U.S. passenger enplanements.
    - S: Small hub that accounts for between 0.05% and 0.25% of total U.S. passenger enplanements.
    - N: Nonhub that accounts for less than 0.05% of total U.S. passenger enplanements, but more than 10,000 annual enplanements.
  - CS: Commercial service – nonprimary are publicly owned airports that receive scheduled passenger service and have at least 2,500 passenger boardings each year.
  - R: Reliever airports are designated by the FAA to relieve congestion at a large commercial service airport and to provide more general aviation access to the overall community.
  - GA: General aviation airports are the largest single group of airports in the U.S. airport system. They are public-use airports that do not have scheduled service or have scheduled service with less than 2,500 passenger boardings each year.
- **Enplanements** – The number of enplanements (commercial passenger boardings) that occurred at the airport in calendar year 2024, as per FAA records released 2025.

City served, Island	FAA	IATA	ICAO	Airport name	Role	Enplanements (2024)
				**Commercial service – primary airports**		
Hilo, Hawaii	ITO	ITO	PHTO	**Hilo International Airport**	P-S	680,640
Honolulu, Oahu	HNL	HNL	PHNL	**Daniel K. Inouye International Airport**	P-L	10,449,022
Kahului, Maui	OGG	OGG	PHOG	**Kahului Airport**	P-M	3,415,615
Kailua-Kona, Hawaii	KOA	KOA	PHKO	**Ellison Onizuka Kona International Airport at Keahole**	P-S	2,023,899
Kaunakakai, Molokai	MKK	MKK	PHMK	**Molokai Airport** (Hoolehua Airport)	P-N	84,029
Lanai City, Lanai	LNY	LNY	PHNY	**Lanai Airport**	P-N	25,186
Lihue, Kauai	LIH	LIH	PHLI	**Lihue Airport**	P-S	1,776,627
				**Commercial service – nonprimary airports**		
Kamuela (Waimea), Hawaii	MUE	MUE	PHMU	**Waimea-Kohala Airport**	CS	3,903
				**Reliever airports**		
Kapolei, Oahu	JRF		PHJR	Kalaeloa Airport (John Rodgers Field)	R	3
				**General aviation airports**		
Hana, Maui	HNM	HNM	PHHN	**Hana Airport**	GA	2,656
Hanapepe, Kauai	PAK	PAK	PHPA	Port Allen Airport	GA	0
Hawi, Hawaii	UPP	UPP	PHUP	ʻUpolu Airport	GA	0
Kalaupapa, Molokai	LUP	LUP	PHLU	**Kalaupapa Airport**	GA	4,174
Lahaina, Maui	JHM	JHM	PHJH	**Kapalua Airport** (Kapalua-West Maui Airport)	GA	1,696
Mokulēia, Oahu	HDH	HDH	PHDH	Dillingham Airfield	GA	0
				**Other government/military airports**		
Honolulu, Oahu	HNL	HIK	PHIK	Hickam Air Force Base (shares runways with Honolulu Int'l)		
Kaneohe, Oahu	NGF		PHNG	MCAS Kaneohe Bay (Marine Corps Base Hawaii)		0
Kekaha, Kauai	BKH	BKH	PHBK	Pacific Missile Range Facility at Barking Sands		
Pohakuloa Training Area, Hawaii	BSF	BSF	PHSF	Bradshaw Army Airfield		
Tern Island, French Frigate Shoals	HFS		PHHF	French Frigate Shoals Airport		
Wahiawa, Oahu	HHI	HHI	PHHI	Wheeler Army Airfield		
				**Notable private-use airports**		
Hanalei, Kauai	HI01	HPV		Princeville Airport (former FAA identifier: HPV)		
				**Notable former airports**		
Ewa, Oahu				MCAS Ewa (closed 1952)		
Haleiwa, Oahu				Haleiwa Fighter Strip (apparently abandoned between 1947 and 1961)		
Ka Lae, Hawaii				Morse Field (closed 1952)		
Kailua-Kona, Hawaii				Old Kona Airport (converted to park in 1970)		
Kāneʻohe Bay, Oahu				Kualoa Airfield (World War II airfield)		
Lahaina, Maui	~~HKP~~	~~HKP~~	~~PHKP~~	Kaanapali Airport (closed 1986)		
Mililani Town, Oahu				Kipapa Airfield (World War II airfield)		
North Shore, Oahu				Kahuku Army Air Field (closed 1946)		
Schofield Barracks, Oahu				Stanley Army Airfield (closed 1940s, now part of the golf course)		
Waimānalo, Oahu				Bellows Field (runways closed 1958, now a military reservation)		
Honolulu, Oahu	~~NPS~~		~~PHNP~~	NALF Ford Island (Closed 1999. General aviation moved to Kalaeloa Airport )		

== See also ==
- Hawaii World War II Army Airfields
- Essential Air Service – Hawaii had four EAS subsidized airports in 2024.
- List of airports by ICAO code: P#PH - Hawaii
- Wikipedia:WikiProject Aviation/Airline destination lists: North America#Hawaii
