= Loretta Fuddy =

American social worker and politician

Director of the Hawaii Department of Health Mayor of Kalawao County
- In office January 2011 – December 11, 2013
- Governor: Neil Abercrombie

Personal details
- Born: April 12, 1948 Honolulu, Hawaii
- Died: December 11, 2013 (aged 65) Pacific Ocean, off the coast of Molokai

Loretta Jean Fuddy (April 12, 1948 – December 11, 2013) was an American health official and social worker from the U.S. state of Hawaii. Fuddy served simultaneously as the Director of the Hawaii Department of Health and the Mayor of Kalawao County from 2011 until her death. Under Hawaii state law, the Hawaii Department of Health administers Kalawao County, and the Director of the Hawaii Department of Health, who is appointed by the governor, simultaneously serves as the Mayor of Kalawao County while in office.

== Life and career ==
Fuddy, who was born on April 12, 1948, was nicknamed "Deliana." She was raised in Kaimuki, on the island of Oahu, and graduated from Sacred Hearts Academy. In a 2013 interview, she described her upbringing as the motivation behind her career in public service, "I'm a child of the ’60s, the Kennedy era of 'ask what you can do for your country' public service and Catholic values." She received degrees in sociology, social work and public health from the University of Hawaii. Fuddy also completed doctoral studies at the Johns Hopkins School of Medicine in Baltimore, Maryland.

Fuddy followed the Subud spiritualist movement, and she was the chairwoman of Subud USA's National Committee from 2006 to 2008.

Fuddy worked in health and human services for forty years. More recently, she served as the Deputy Director of the Hawaii Department of Health from 2001 until 2002. She then became the Chief of Family Health Services for the state health department prior to her appointment as Director in 2011.

Fuddy became the acting Director of the Hawaii Department of Health on January 26, 2011. Governor Neil Abercrombie appointed her Director of the department on March 2, 2011. The Department of Health administers the small county of Kalawao, so Fuddy also became the Mayor of Kalawao County under Hawaii state law. Fuddy was the first social worker to serve as Hawaii's health director.

Fuddy also is remembered as the Director of the Hawaii Department of Health who in 2011 was responsible for approving the release of a copy of President Barack Obama's long-form birth certificate. Some individuals, known as "birthers," had questioned the authenticity of Obama's birth certificate and claimed that he was not born in the United States. In response to these claims, the White House released a copy of Obama's long-form birth certificate.

== Death ==
On December 11, 2013, Fuddy traveled to Kalawao County for an annual meeting with the county's Hansen's disease patients in Kalaupapa as part of her duties as both Mayor and state health director. Fuddy and other officials concluded the meeting and boarded a Makani Kai Air Cessna 208 to return to Honolulu, which crashed shortly after takeoff due to an engine malfunction. Fuddy was the sole fatality of the flight. The coroner's report stated that Fuddy had died from cardiac arrhythmia due to hyperventilation while she and the others awaited rescue in the cold ocean water.

Her funeral was held at the Co-Cathedral of Saint Theresa of the Child Jesus in Honolulu on December 21, 2013. Speakers included Governor Neil Abercrombie. Attendees included state Senators Michelle Kidani and Suzanne Chun Oakland.
