= Waikolu, Hawaii =

Unincorporated community in Hawaii, US

Waikolu
- Unincorporated community
- Location within the state of Hawaii
- Coordinates: 21°9′9″N 156°55′26″W
- Country: United States
- State: Hawaii
- County: Maui / Kalawao

Area
  - Total: 5.544 sq mi (14.359 km^{2})
- Elevation: 1,581 ft (482 m)

Population (2000)
  - Total: 1
  - Density: 0.18/sq mi (0.070/km^{2})
- Time zone: UTC-10 (Hawaii-Aleutian)
- GNIS feature ID: 364703

Waikolu Valley is on the North Shore of Molokai in Hawaii. Access to this uninhabited valley is currently restricted as it is partly within the Kalaupapa National Historical Park.

== History ==
Hawaiians lived along the North Shore of Molokai including Waikolu Valley, cultivating taro and other food crops. These isolated valleys were visited in the summer months when the weather is calmer; in winter, heavy surf renders the beaches inaccessible by outrigger canoe, the islanders' chief form of transportation.

The Native Hawaiian inhabitants were removed in 1865 and 1866 when the leper colony was established on the Kalaupapa Peninsula. Waikolu Valley was where the first leprosy patients were off loaded in 1866. However, the valley was soon abandoned, and the colony was established at Kalawao nearby.
