= Hawaii Department of Health =

U.S. state government agency

The Hawaii State Department of Health (DOH) is a state agency of Hawaiʻi, with its headquarters in Honolulu CDP, Honolulu County, on the island of Oʻahu.

The Hawai'i Department of Health is organized into three administrations: Health Resources, Behavioral Health, and Environmental Health. The role of the Health Resources Administration is to prevent, detect, and manage disease and threatening situations, and assure care to people with special health needs. The Behavioral Health Administration is responsible for improving the lives of those suffering from substance use and mental health illness by providing education, prevention, therapy and treatment services. The environmental health administration ensures that environmental safety regulations are satisfied and manages cases that pose threats to environmental safety.

The Hawaiʻi Department of Health was established under Hawaiʻi Revised Statutes §26-13. The department is responsible for the well-being for the people of Hawaiʻi.

The Hawaiʻi Department of Health administers Kalawao County, the state's smallest county, which consists of the three villages Kalaupapa, Kalawao, and part of Waikolu, located on the Kalaupapa Peninsula on the north coast of Moloka'i. Under State of Hawaiʻi law, the director of the Hawaiʻi Department of Health, who is appointed by the governor, also serves as the mayor of Kalawao County. The mayor of Kalawao County holds the executive responsibilities for the county.
