= Molokai Airport =

Airport in Maui County, Hawaii

Molokai Airport Kahua Mokulele o Moloka‘i
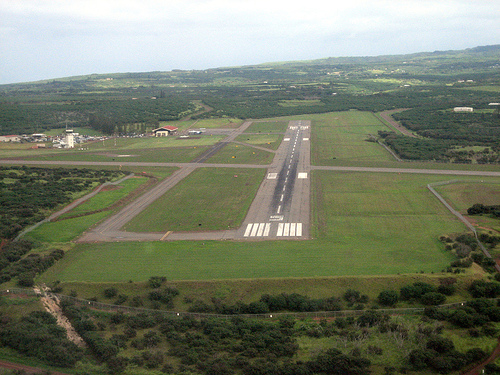
- Approach to Runway 5 (2008)
- IATA: MKK; ICAO: PHMK; FAA LID: MKK; WMO: 91186

Summary
- Airport type: Public
- Owner/Operator: Hawaii Department of Transportation
- Serves: Molokai
- Elevation AMSL: 454 ft (138 m)
- Coordinates: 21°09′10″N 157°05′47″W
- Website: hawaii.gov/mkk

Map
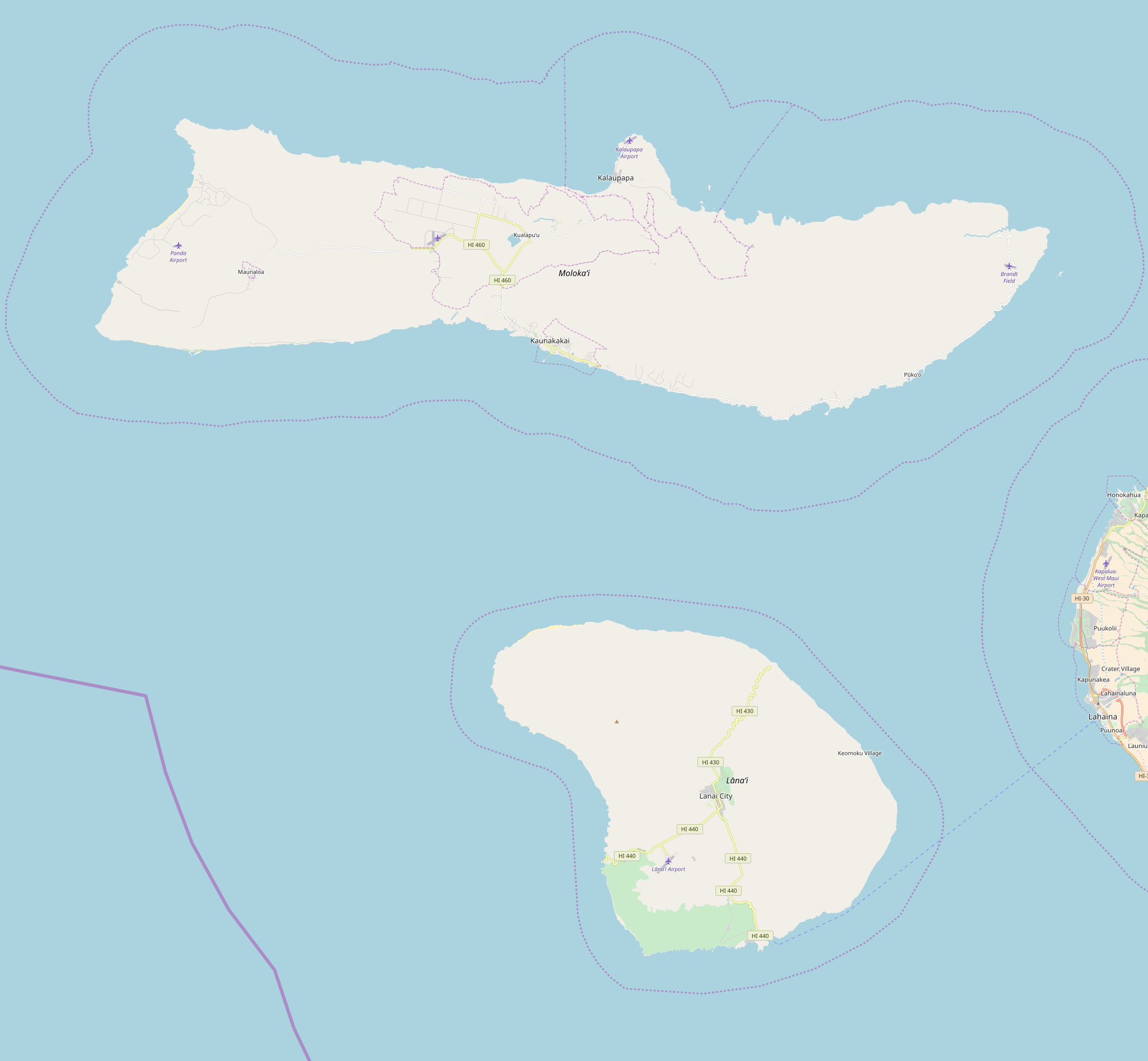
- Location of airport in Hawaii MKK (Hawaii)

Runways
Direction	Length		Surface
Direction	ft	m	Surface
5/23	4,494	1,370	Asphalt
17/35	3,118	950	Asphalt

Statistics
- Aircraft operations (2019): 45,219
- Based aircraft (2022): 6
- Source: Federal Aviation Administration

Molokai Airport, (IATA: MKK, ICAO: PHMK, FAA LID: MKK) also known as Hoolehua Airport is a state-owned, public use airport located six nautical miles (7 mi, 11 km) northwest of Kaunakakai, on the island of Molokai in Maui County, Hawaii, United States. It is the principal airport of the island. The largest plane to ever fly here regularly was a Boeing 737-200 jet, which seats 127 passengers.

It is included in the Federal Aviation Administration (FAA) National Plan of Integrated Airport Systems for 2021–2025, in which it is categorized as a non-hub primary commercial service facility.

== Facilities and aircraft ==
Molokai Airport occupies 288 acres (117 ha) at an elevation of 454 ft (138 m) above mean sea level on the central plateau of the island of Molokai. The airport has two asphalt paved runways that accommodate commuter/air taxi and general aviation activities, as well as some military flights: runway 5/23 is 4,494 by 100 ft (1,370 by 30 m) and runway 17/35 is 3,118 by 100 ft (950 by 30 m).

The passenger terminal complex and general aviation facilities are north of the runway intersection; the passenger terminal complex is near the principal runway and the general aviation facilities are near the crosswind runway. Vehicular access to these two areas is provided by separate access roadways, each connecting with Keonelele Avenue.

For the 12-month period ending January 11, 2019, the airport had 45,219 aircraft operations, an average of 124 per day: 86% air taxi, 11% general aviation and 3% military. In April 2022, there were six aircraft based at this airport, all single-engine.

== Airlines and destinations ==
Mokolai Airport is connected to Honolulu International Airport by Lanai Airlines and Mokulele Airlines, and to Kahului Airport and Kalaupapa Airport by Mokulele Airlines.

== Accidents and incidents ==
- October 28, 1989: Aloha Island Air Flight 1712 (flight number: MKU1712), a de Havilland Canada DHC-6 Twin Otter registered as N707PV, collided with mountains at night near Halawa Valley, Molokai, while en route on a scheduled passenger flight from Kahului Airport to Molokai Airport in Hoolehua. The NTSB determined the cause of the accident was the airplane's controlled flight into terrain as a result of the decision of the captain to continue the flight under visual flight rules at night into instrument meteorological conditions, which obscured rising mountains. All 20 aboard the aircraft died. 13 of the victims were from Molokai, including eight members of the Molokai High School boys' and girls' volleyball teams and two faculty members. The girls' team had just qualified on Maui for the state tournament.
- May 10, 2000: A Rockwell North American Sabreliner 65 operated by Price Aircraft Company inbound from Kahului Airport impacted a mountain ridge 3.3 miles SW of Kaunakaka on a night visual approach to MKK. All six occupants (two crew, four passengers) were killed.

== See also ==
- List of airports in Hawaii
