= Daniel K. Inouye International Airport =

Airport serving Honolulu, Hawaii, US

Daniel K. Inouye International Airport Kahua Mokulele Kauʻāina o Daniel K. Inouye
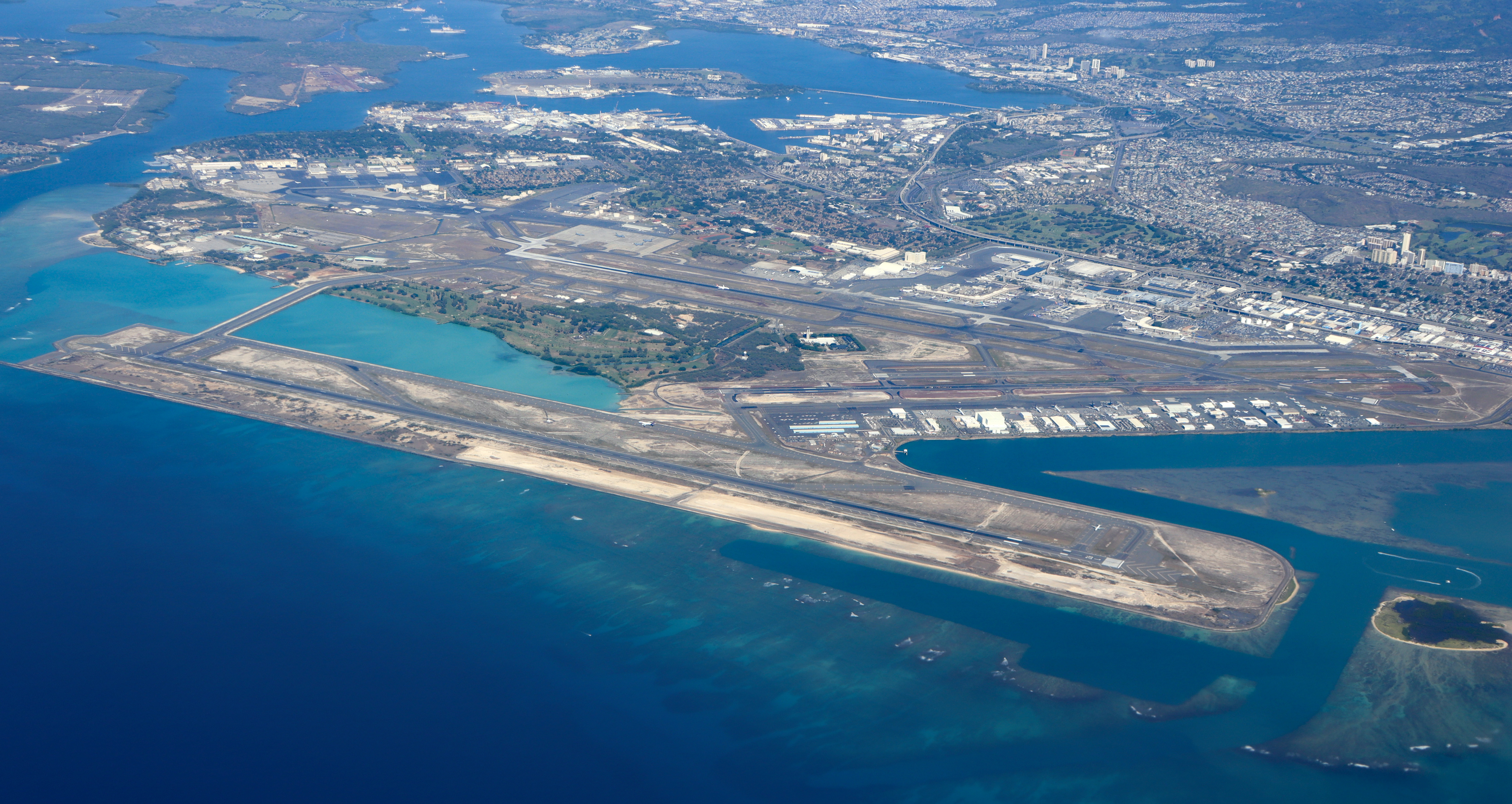
- IATA: HNL; ICAO: PHNL; FAA LID: HNL; WMO: 91182

Summary
- Airport type: Public / military
- Owner/Operator: Hawaii Department of Transportation / United States Navy
- Serves: Oahu
- Location: Honolulu, Hawaii, United States
- Opened: March 21, 1927; 99 years ago
- Hub for: Aloha Air Cargo; Asia Pacific Airlines; Hawaiian Airlines; Mokulele Airlines; Transair; Corporate Air
- Elevation AMSL: 13 ft (4.0 m)
- Coordinates: 21°19′07″N 157°55′21″W
- Website: www.hawaii.gov/hnl

Maps
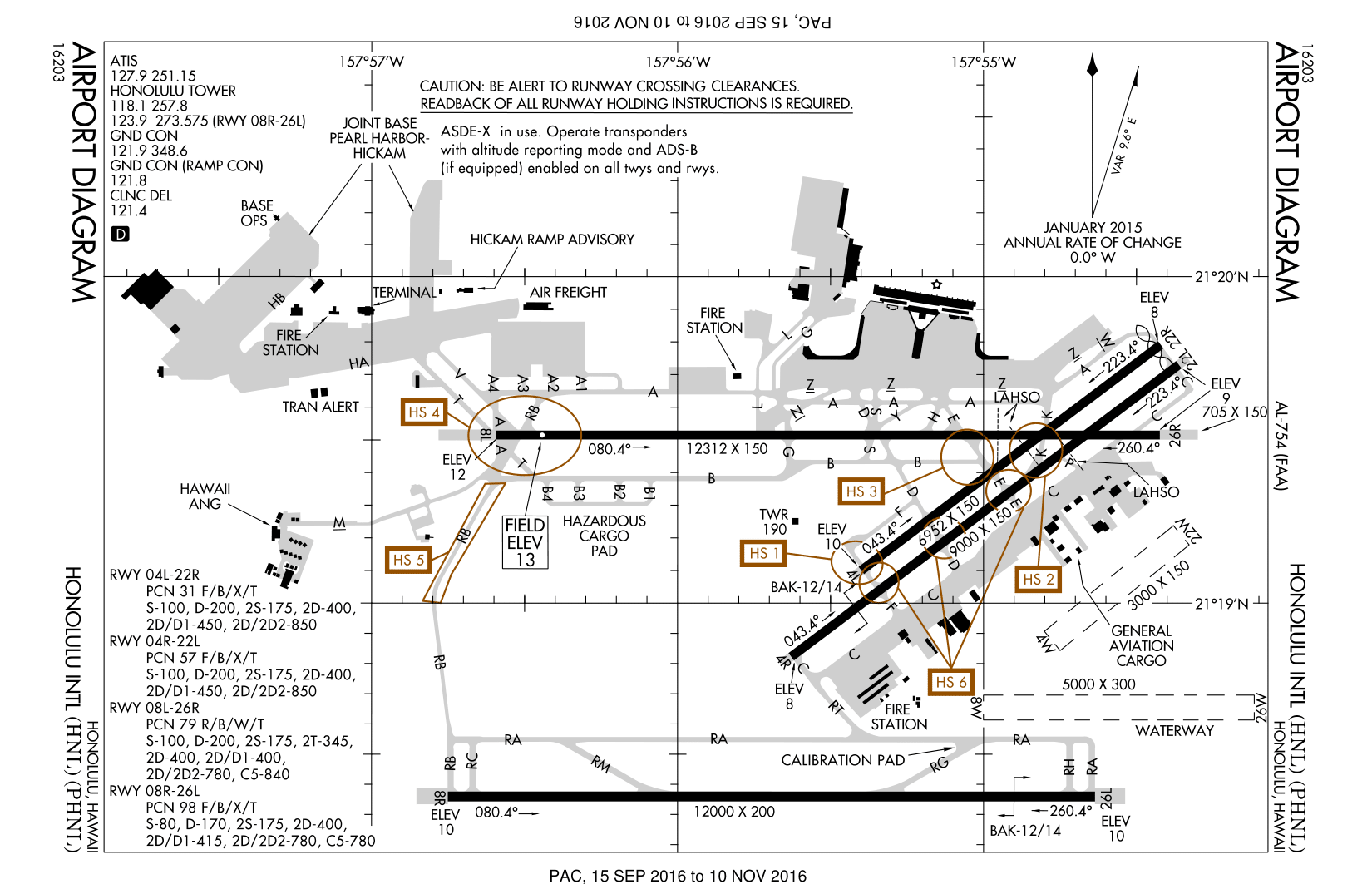
- FAA airport diagram
- Interactive map of Daniel K. Inouye International Airport

Runways
Direction	Length		Surface
Direction	m	ft	Surface
04L/22R	2,120	6,955	Asphalt
04R/22L	2,744	9,002	Asphalt
08L/26R	3,767	12,360	Asphalt
08R/26L	3,658	12,000	Asphalt

Statistics (2025)
- Aircraft operations: 314,702
- Total passengers: 21,985,522 ▲1%
- Total cargo (US tons): 623,151
- Sources: Hawaii Dept. of Transportation-Airports Division

Daniel K. Inouye International Airport (IATA: HNL, ICAO: PHNL, FAA LID: HNL), also known as Honolulu International Airport, is the primary airport serving the U.S. state of Hawaii. The airport is named after Honolulu native and Medal of Honor recipient Daniel Inouye (1924–2012), who represented Hawaii in the United States Senate from 1963 until his death in 2012. The airport is in the Honolulu census-designated place three miles (five kilometers) northwest of Honolulu's central business district. The airport covers 4,220 acres (1,710 hectares), more than 1% of the entire Oahu Island.

Daniel K. Inouye Airport offers nonstop flights to many places in North America, Asia, and Oceania. The airport serves as the main hub of Hawaiian Airlines and is also a base for Aloha Air Cargo. The airport is included in the Federal Aviation Administration (FAA) National Plan of Integrated Airport Systems for 2017–2021, in which it is categorized as a large-hub primary commercial service facility.

== History ==
The airport opened on March 21, 1927, as John Rodgers Airport (aka Rodgers Field), after World War I naval officer John Rodgers. It was funded by the territorial legislature and the Chamber of Commerce, and was the first full airport in Hawaii; aircraft had previously been limited to small landing strips, fields, and seaplane docks. From 1939 to 1943, the adjacent Keehi Lagoon was dredged for use by seaplanes, and the dredged soil was moved to HNL to provide more space for conventional planes.

The U.S. military grounded all civil aircraft and took over all civil airports after the attack on Pearl Harbor, and Rodgers Field was designated Naval Air Station Honolulu. The Navy built a control tower and terminal building, and some commercial traffic was allowed during daylight hours. Rodgers Field was returned to the Territory of Hawaii in 1946. At the time, at 4,019 acres (1,626 hectares), it was one of the largest airports in the United States, with four paved land runways and three seaplane runways.

John Rodgers Airport was renamed Honolulu Airport in 1947; "International" being added to the name in 1951. Being near the center of the Pacific Ocean it was a stop for many transpacific flights. By 1950, it was the third-busiest airport in the United States in terms of aircraft operations, and its 13,097-foot (3,992 m) runway was the world's longest in 1953. In February 1954, flagship carrier of Japan, Japan Airlines began the direct flight service to Honolulu on its flights between Tokyo and San Francisco. In summer 1959, Qantas began the first jet service to Honolulu on its flights between Australia and California. Qantas introduced these jet flights with Boeing 707 aircraft operating a routing of Sydney – Fiji – Honolulu – San Francisco. Aeronautical engineer and airline consultant Frank Der Yuen advised in the design of the original building and founded its aerospace museum.

The original terminal building on the southeast side of runways 4 was replaced by the John Rodgers Terminal, which was dedicated on August 22, 1962, and opened on October 14, 1962. From 1970 through 1978, the architect Vladimir Ossipoff designed a terminal modernization project that remodeled this terminal and created several additions, which included the Diamond Head Concourse in 1970, the Ewa Concourse in 1972, and the Central Concourse in 1980.

Pan American World Airways (Pan Am) used Honolulu as a transpacific hub for many years, initially as a connecting point between the West Coast and Polynesia (Fiji, New Caledonia, and New Zealand) in 1946, followed by service to Japan and China through Midway Island and Wake Island from 1947. By 1960, Pan American was serving the airport with Boeing 707 jets. Pan Am flight number 1, operating a 707, flew a westbound routing of San Francisco – Honolulu – Wake Island – Tokyo – Hong Kong and continuing on to New York City via stops in Asia and Europe. The airline also operated nonstop 707 service to Portland, Oregon (continuing to Seattle) and Los Angeles. Pan Am also had direct 707 flights from Honolulu to Calcutta, Guam, Jakarta, Karachi, Manila, Rangoon, Saigon, and Singapore in 1960. United Airlines was flying nonstop Douglas DC-6 "Mainliner" service from San Francisco in 1947 and by 1961 was operating Douglas DC-8 jet service nonstop from Los Angeles and San Francisco with direct one-stop DC-8 flights from both Chicago and New York City. British Commonwealth Pacific Airlines (BCPA) began serving the airport during the mid-1940s with Douglas DC-4 aircraft flying a routing of Sydney – Auckland – Fiji – Canton Island – Honolulu – San Francisco – Vancouver, B.C. In 1950, Northwest Airlines was operating nonstop flights from Seattle with Boeing 377 Stratocruiser propliners; by 1961, Northwest was flying daily Douglas DC-8 jet service on a round trip routing of New York City – Chicago – Seattle – Portland, OR – Honolulu. Also in 1950, Canadian Pacific Air Lines (which later became CP Air) was operating service between western Canada and Australia with a routing of Vancouver – Honolulu – Canton Island – Fiji – Sydney.

Honolulu-based air carriers Aloha Airlines and Hawaiian Airlines had both introduced jet service on their respective inter-island routes in Hawaii by 1966 with Aloha operating British Aircraft Corporation BAC One-Eleven jets and Hawaiian flying Douglas DC-9-10 jets with both airlines also continuing to operate turboprops on their island services at this time. According to their respective timetables, Aloha was flying Fairchild F-27 and Vickers Viscount propjets while Hawaiian was operating Convair 640 propjets in addition to their new jet aircraft in 1966. Both local air carriers would eventually operate service to the U.S. mainland as well as to the South Pacific while continuing to operate inter-island flights. In 1986, Hawaiian was operating nonstop Lockheed L-1011 Tristar service from Honolulu to Las Vegas, Los Angeles, San Francisco, and Seattle as well as one-stop direct service to Portland, Oregon, and also nonstop Douglas DC-8 service to Pago Pago with this flight continuing on to Tonga. By 2003, Aloha was flying nonstop Boeing 737-700 service to Burbank, Oakland, Orange County, and Vancouver, B.C., with one-stop service to Las Vegas, Phoenix, Reno, and Sacramento in addition to operating nonstop flights to Kwajalein and Pago Pago with one-stop service to Majuro and Rarotonga.

In the spring of 1969, Braniff International introduced nonstop Boeing 707-320 service to Honolulu from Dallas Love Field, Houston Hobby Airport, and St. Louis, with one-stop service from Atlanta, Miami, and New Orleans. At the same time, United Airlines introduced daily nonstop Douglas DC-8-62 flights from New York City and was continuing to operate nonstop DC-8 service to Honolulu from Los Angeles and San Francisco. Also in 1969, Western Airlines was operating nonstop Boeing 707 and Boeing 720B service not only from several California cities but also from Anchorage, Denver, Minneapolis–St. Paul, and Phoenix. By 1981, Western was operating one-stop McDonnell Douglas DC-10-30 service from London Gatwick Airport via a polar route with a stop in Anchorage. By the mid-1970s Pan Am offered nonstop service from Honolulu to Japan, Guam, Australia, New Zealand, and Fiji, as well as to cities on the West Coast. Continental Airlines used Honolulu as a stopover point for charter service to Southeast Asia during the Vietnam War era, and to feed its Guam-based Air Micronesia operation. By the early 1970s, Continental was operating scheduled nonstop flights between Honolulu and Los Angeles, Portland, Oregon, and Seattle, including Boeing 747-100 nonstops from Los Angeles and one-stop 747 flights from Chicago. Air Micronesia had service to Guam via stops at Midway Island, Kwajalein, Majuro, Ponape and Truk flying a Boeing 727-100. American Airlines also operated flights to Auckland, Sydney, Fiji and Pago Pago via Honolulu during the early 1970s in addition to operating nonstop Boeing 707-320 flights from St. Louis.

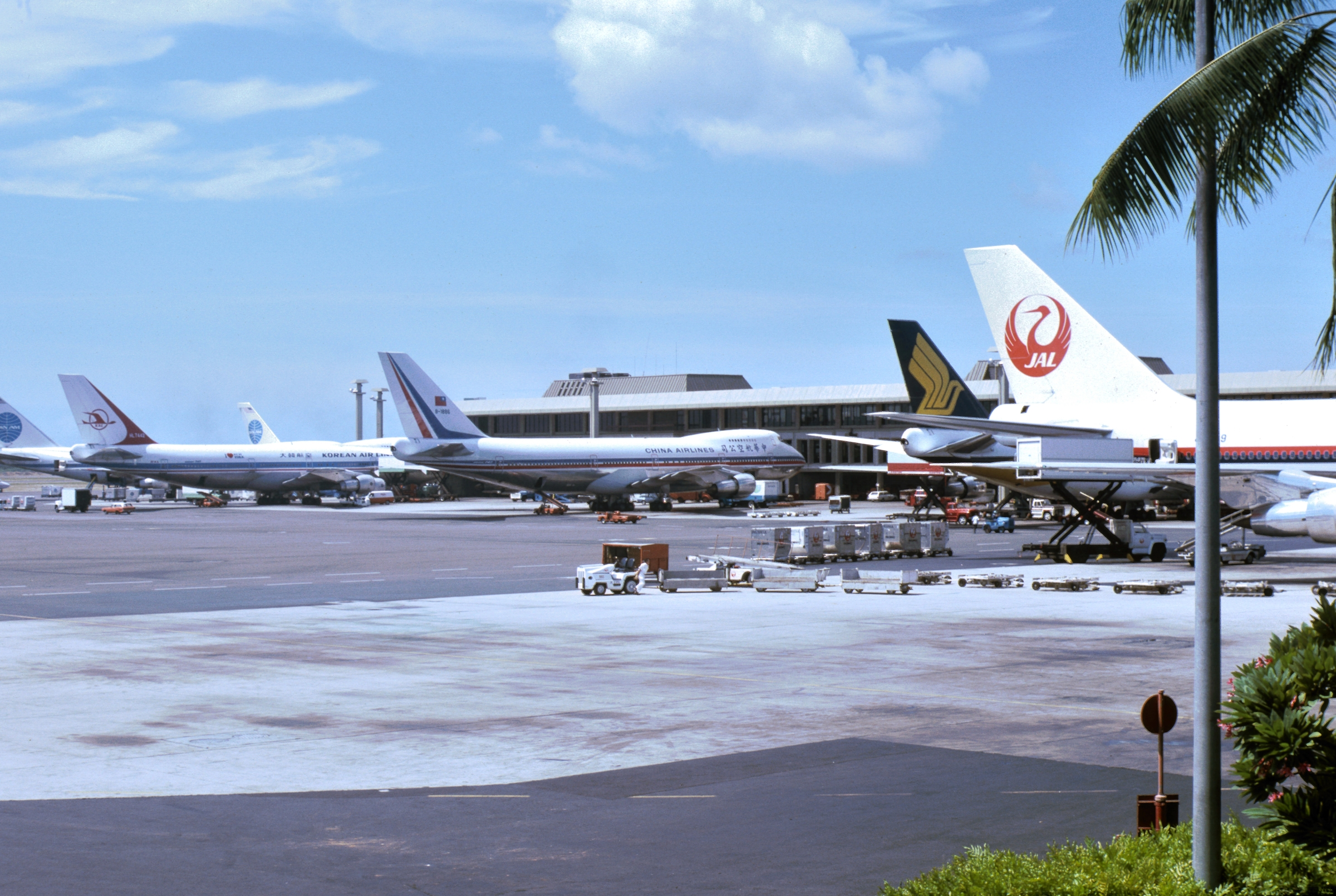
Japan Airlines, Singapore Airlines, China Airlines, Korean Air, and Pan Am Boeing 747s at Terminal 2 in September 1981

Over the years, many foreign air carriers used Honolulu as a transpacific stopover point, including Air New Zealand, BOAC (now British Airways), British Commonwealth Pacific Airlines, Canadian Pacific Air Lines, China Airlines, Garuda Indonesia, Japan Airlines, Korean Air, Philippine Airlines, Qantas, Real Transportes Aereos (a Brazilian airline), and Singapore Airlines as well as French air carriers Union de Transports Aeriens (UTA) and its predecessor Transports Aeriens Intercontinentaux (TAI). BOAC served Honolulu as part of its around the world services during the 1960s and early 1970s, first with Bristol Britannia turboprop airliners and later with Boeing 707 and Vickers VC10 jets. Pan Am, Trans World Airlines (TWA) and Japan Airlines also served Honolulu as a stop on their respective around the world services during the early 1970s. In 1979, Braniff International was operating all of its flights from the airport with Boeing 747 aircraft with nonstops to Dallas–Fort Worth, Guam, and Los Angeles as well as one-stop service to Hong Kong and also one-stop service to Bogota in South America. Several small airlines based in the South Pacific also served Honolulu. In 1983, Air Nauru was operating Boeing 737-200 nonstop flights from Majuro with direct service from Nauru, Air Niugini was flying Boeing 707 aircraft nonstop from Port Moresby, Papua New Guinea and Air Tungaru was operating Boeing 727-100 aircraft nonstop from Christmas Island. Also in 1983, Honolulu-based South Pacific Island Airways was operating nonstop Boeing 707 service from Anchorage, Guam, Pago Pago and Papeete.

In April 1974, American Airlines, Braniff International, Continental Airlines, Northwest Airlines, Pan Am, TWA, United Airlines and Western Airlines were all operating nonstop services on domestic routes from the U.S. mainland while CP Air, a Canadian airline, was operating international nonstop service from Vancouver and on to the South Pacific during the mid-1970s. Just over 25 years later, in June 1999, U.S.-based air carriers operating domestic nonstop services from the mainland included American Airlines, American Trans Air, Continental, Delta Air Lines, Hawaiian Airlines, Northwest, TWA, and United, while Air Canada, Canadian Airlines International (the successor to CP Air), and Canada 3000 were operating nonstop services from Canada.

=== Modernization and history since 2006 ===
Air traffic control tower at HNL

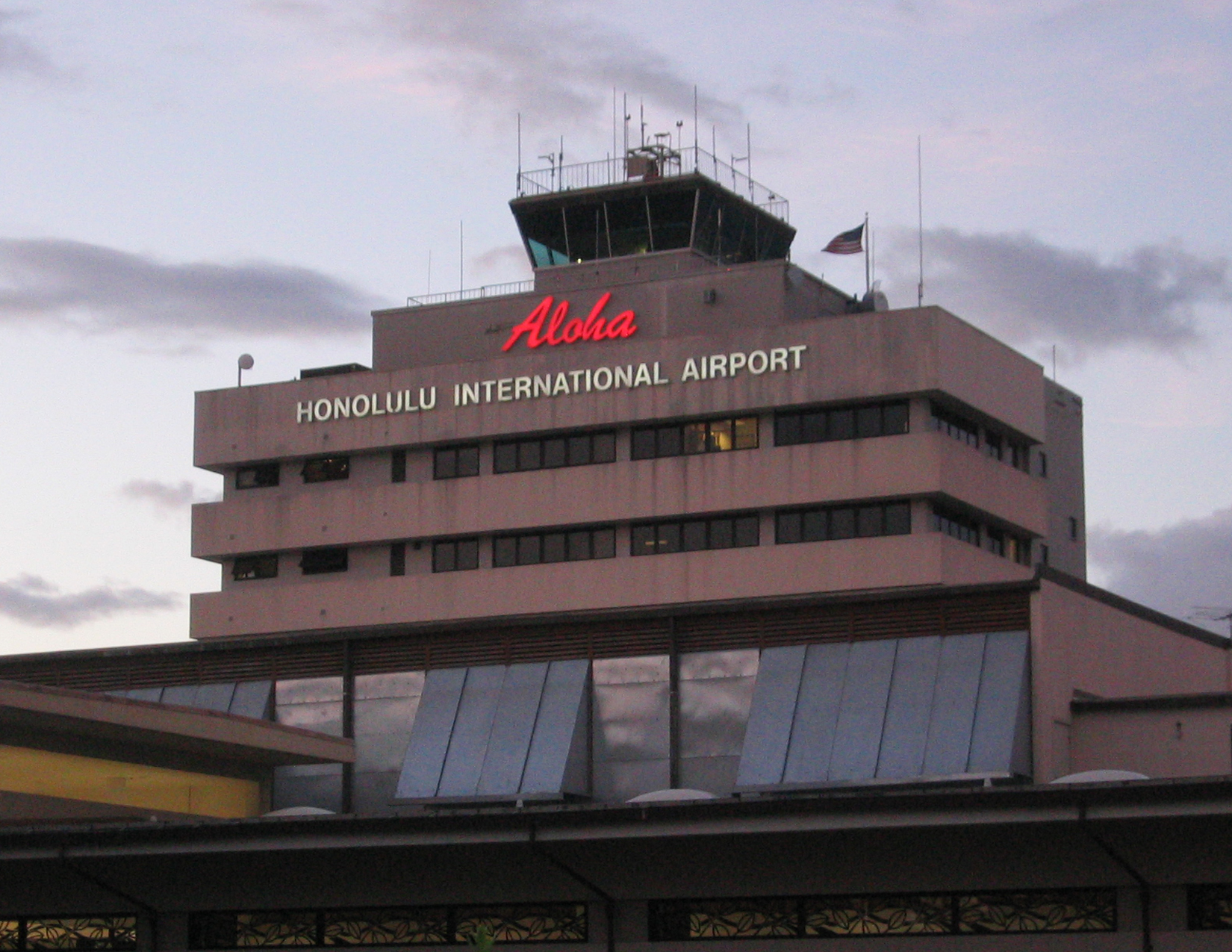
Tower with previous name, 2006

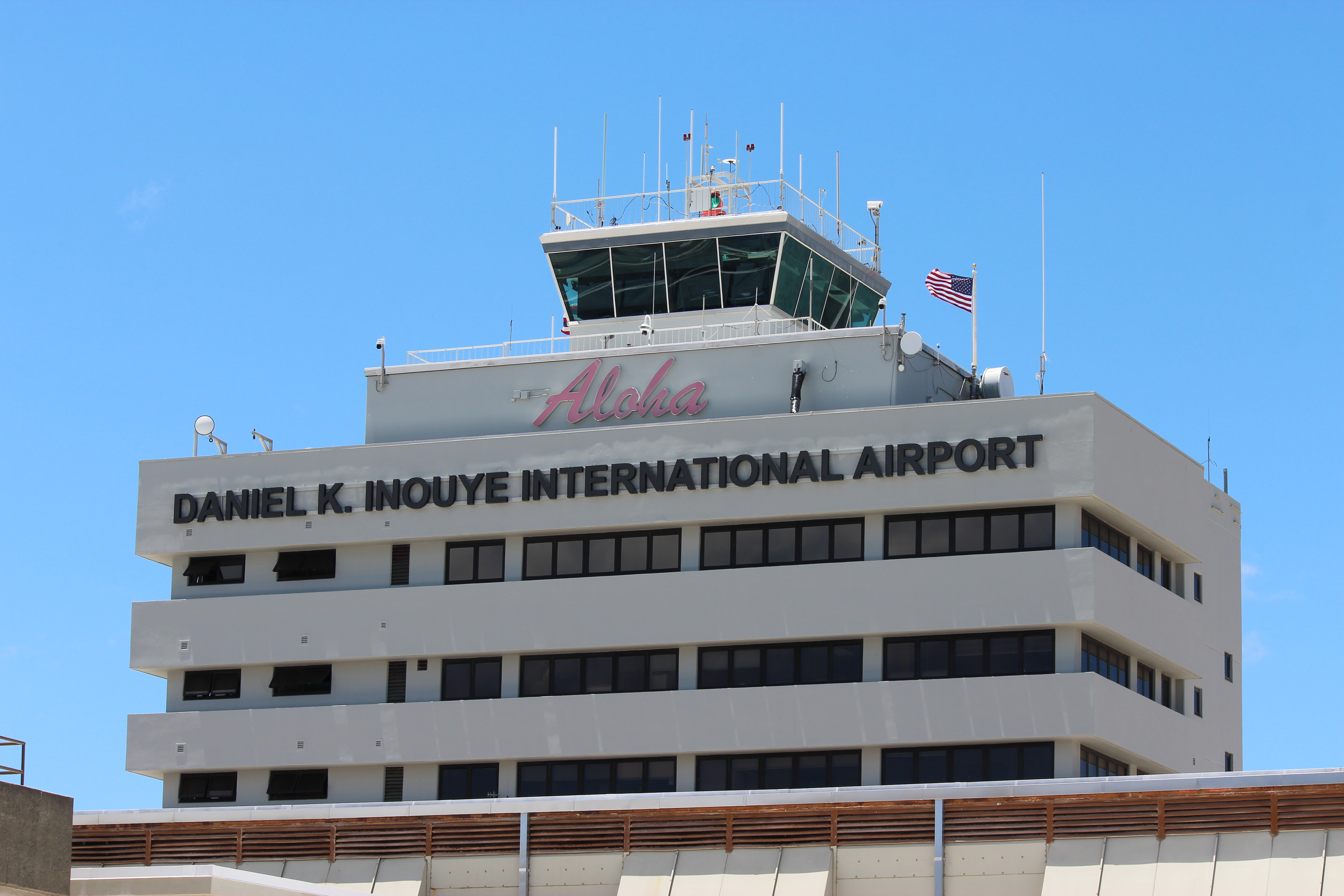
Tower with current name, 2025

After thirty years, Ossipoff's "forward-looking and flexible design" for the Overseas Terminal had become quite dated. A 2007 retrospective book on Ossipoff's architecture noted that his terminal design was "facing the challenges of new standards of accessibility, comfort, and security", and was therefore likely to be altered or obliterated in the near future.

On March 24, 2006, Hawaii Governor Linda Lingle unveiled a $2.3 billion modernization program for Hawaii airports over a 12-year period, with $1.7 billion budgeted for Honolulu International Airport. The plan involves implementing short-term projects within the first five years to improve passenger service and increase security and operational efficiencies.

As part of the modernization, flight display monitors throughout the airport were upgraded, new food and beverage vendors were added, and a new parking garage across from the international arrival terminal was completed. An international arrivals corridor with moving sidewalks built atop the breezeway leading to the Ewa Concourse was completed in 2010.

In 2011, Hawaiian Airlines renovated the check-in lobby of the Interisland Terminal, replacing the traditional check-in counters with six circular check-in islands in the middle of the lobbies, which can be used for inter-island, mainland, and international flights. This renovation project was fully funded by Hawaiian Airlines and not a part of the modernization program.

By 2012, Hawaiian Airlines was re-establishing Honolulu International Airport as a connecting hub between the United States mainland and the Asia-Pacific region. That year, according to a Massachusetts Institute of Technology study, the airport had 24% fewer domestic departure flights than it did in 2007.

During the 2016 legislative session, the Hawaii state legislature passed a resolution requesting that the U.S. Department of Transportation rename Honolulu International Airport for the late U.S. senator and Medal of Honor recipient Daniel Inouye. The new name first appeared in Federal Aviation Administration documentation on April 27, 2017, and the airport was officially renamed in a ceremony at the airport on May 30, 2017.

On June 1, 2018, the Hawaii Department of Transportation started renumbering all gates and baggage claim carousels. Gates were renamed alphanumerically, baggage carousels were renumbered from alphanumerical to numerical, and the Interisland and Overseas terminals were redesignated Terminals 1 and 2 respectively. HDOT cited the expansion of existing terminals in the airport as a reason to renumber all gates and baggage carousels. The renumbering was the first done since 1993.

After years of delays, the state airports division broke ground on the Mauka Concourse in Terminal 1 on May 30, 2018, and completed construction on August 26, 2021. The first concourse expansion at HNL since 1995, the new concourse includes gates that can accommodate wide-body jets, thus reducing the need for Hawaiian Airlines passengers to walk between Terminals 1 and 2 for overseas arrivals and departures, and freeing up gate space for other airlines.

A new consolidated rental car facility (CONRAC) was built on the east side of Terminal 2 and was completed on December 1, 2021. The 1.8 million square foot five-story facility is a short walk from Terminal 2 baggage claim and is also served by a consolidated shuttle bus service.

In September 2024, the airport announced that travelers with a Hawaii drivers' license or identification card can now present a digital ID at TSA checkpoints at the airport, marking Hawaii as the 11th state to allow the use of digital IDs at security.

== Facilities ==
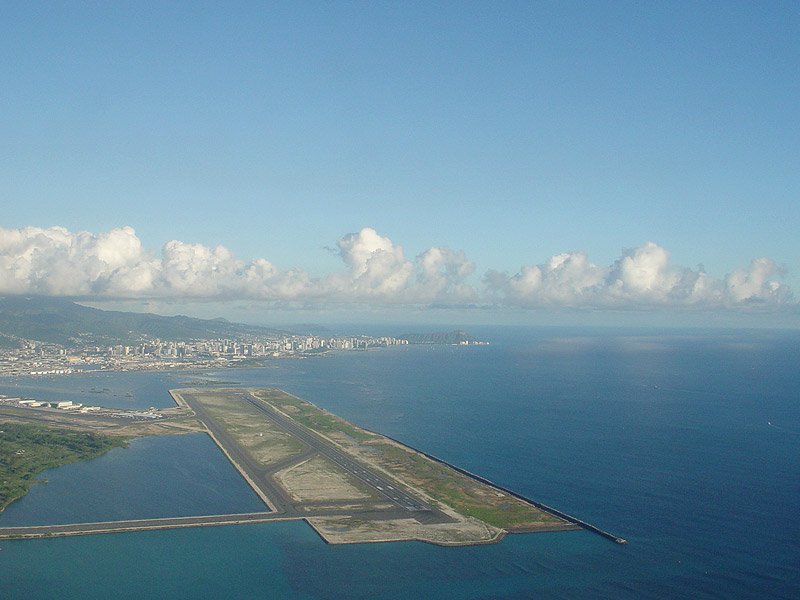
The Reef Runway with Honolulu in the background

The airport has four major runways, which it operates in conjunction with the adjacent Hickam Air Force Base. The principal runway designated 8R/26L, also known as the Reef Runway, was the world's first major runway constructed entirely offshore. Completed in 1977, the Reef Runway was a designated alternate landing site for the Space Shuttle.

In addition to the four paved runways, Daniel K. Inouye International Airport has two designated offshore waterways designated 8W/26W and 4W/22W for use by seaplanes.

=== Terminals ===
Daniel K. Inouye International Airport has 60 gates (54 jet-way gates and 6 hard stands) in three terminals. Terminal 1 and Terminal 2 are connected post-security, however, passengers walking from Terminal 1 to Terminal 2 must pass through a USDA agricultural inspection station for carry-on luggage.

Terminal 1 (formerly known as the "Interisland Terminal") opened in 1993 and has 25 gates. The $130 million 8-gate terminal was the largest construction project undertaken at that time by the State Airports Division and replaced an earlier terminal built in 1961. In 1995, a 5-gate extension to the terminal, which also featured a new post-security walkway to Terminal 2, opened.

On May 30, 2018, the state airports division broke ground on the Mauka Concourse after years of delays. This new concourse adds space for 11 narrow-body aircraft or six wide-body aircraft and also features a post-security walkway to the rest of Terminal 1 and a new six-lane TSA security checkpoint. The Mauka Concourse opened for passenger use on August 27, 2021.

Continuing the improvements to Terminal 1, Hawaiian Airlines spent $14 million on a new four-lane security checkpoint located at the makai end of the terminal. This new security checkpoint opened on February 18, 2023, and replaced the security checkpoint that was previously located in the center of the terminal.

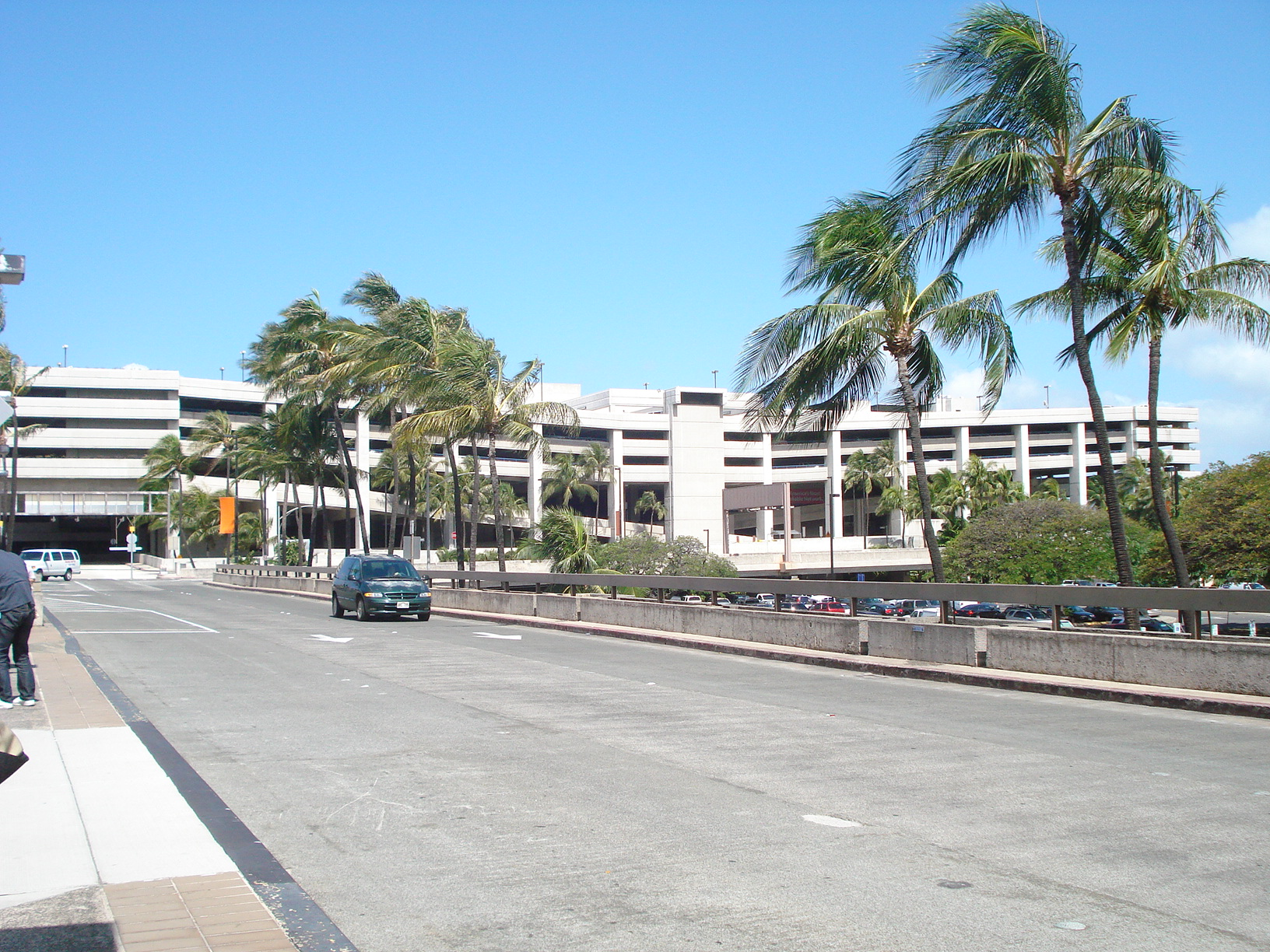
Terminal 1

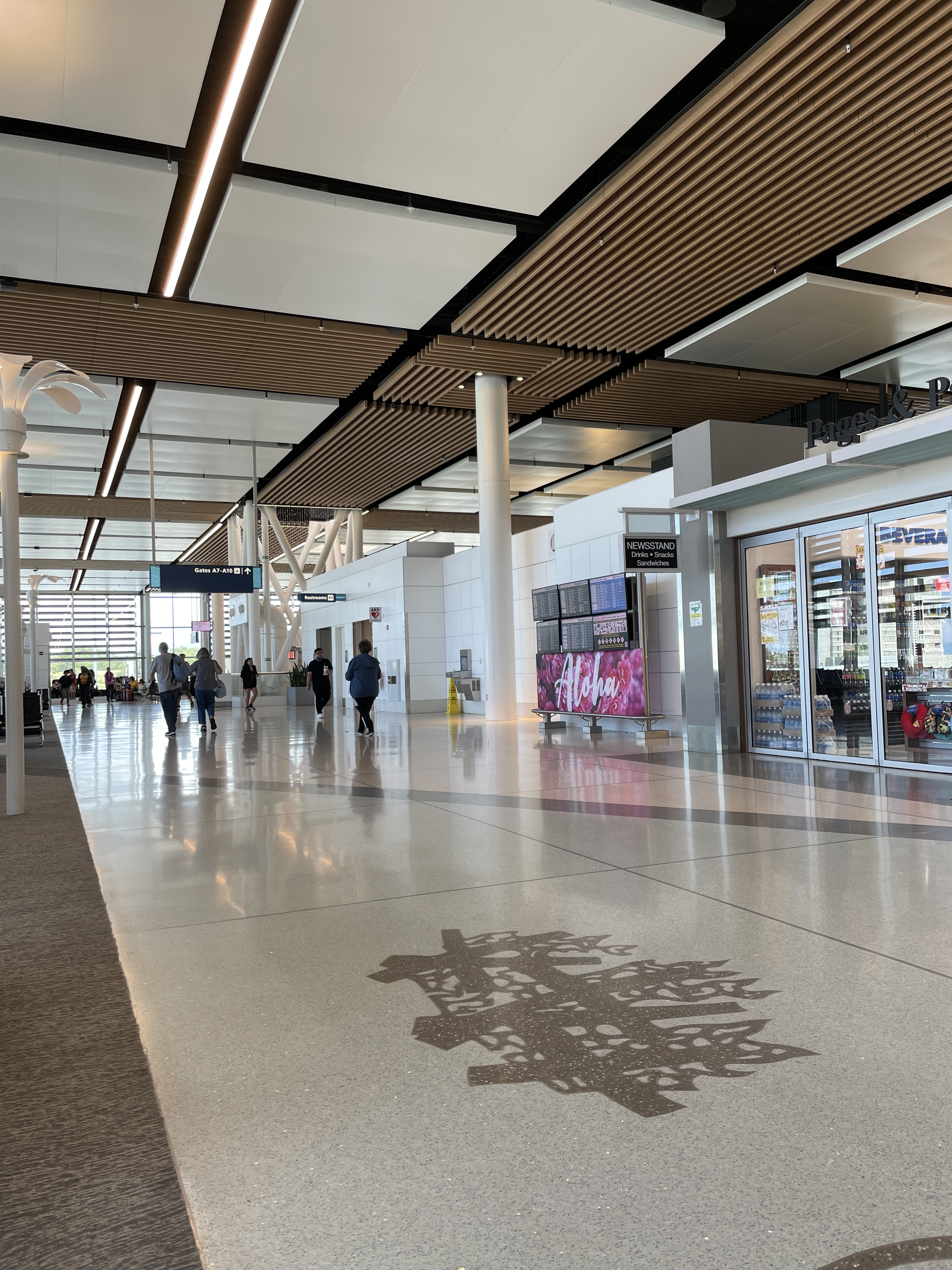
Terminal 1 Mauka Concourse

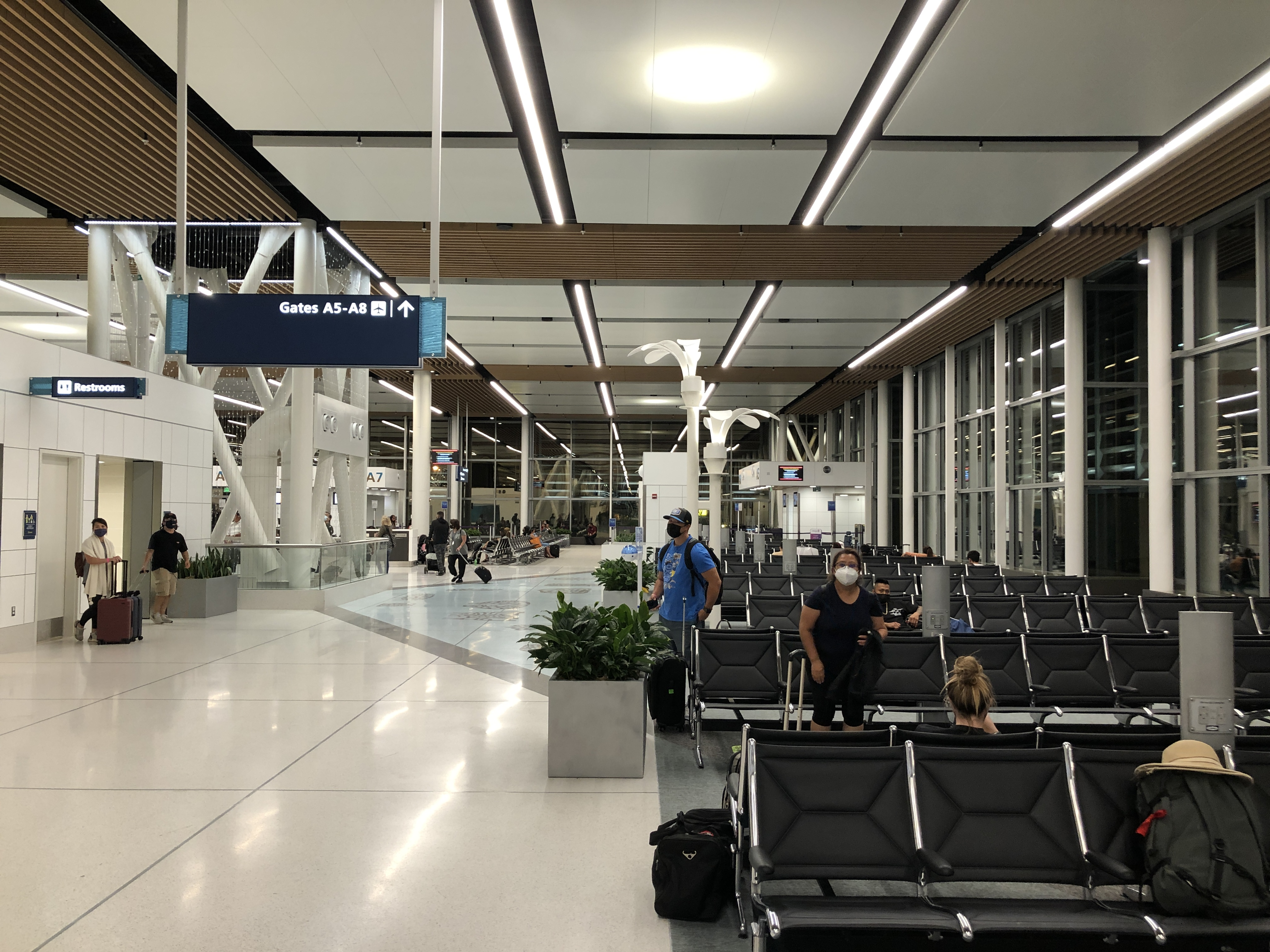
Terminal 1 Mauka Concourse

Terminal 2 (formerly known as the "Overseas Terminal") opened in 1962 and has 29 gates. Terminal 2 is the largest terminal at HNL and is the only terminal which can take international arrivals. From 1970 through 1978, architect Vladimir Ossipoff designed a terminal modernization project that remodeled this terminal and created several additions, which included the Diamond Head Concourse in 1970, the Ewa Concourse in 1972, and the Central Concourse in 1980. Two 3-jetway gates to accommodate an Airbus A380 (C4 and C9) were added to the terminal in 2018; this was done to support All Nippon Airways's A380 flights between Tokyo's Narita Airport and Honolulu.

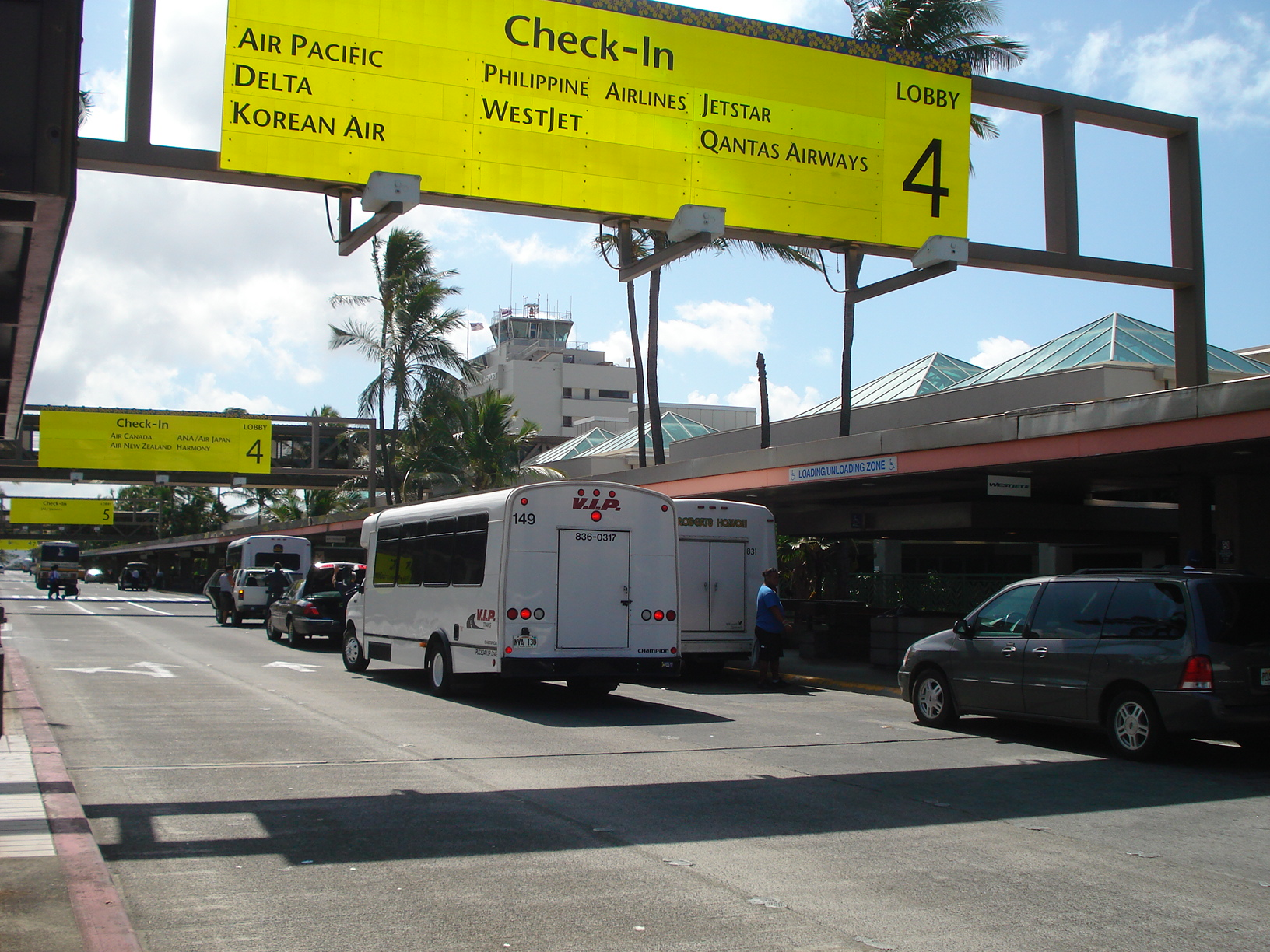
Terminal 2

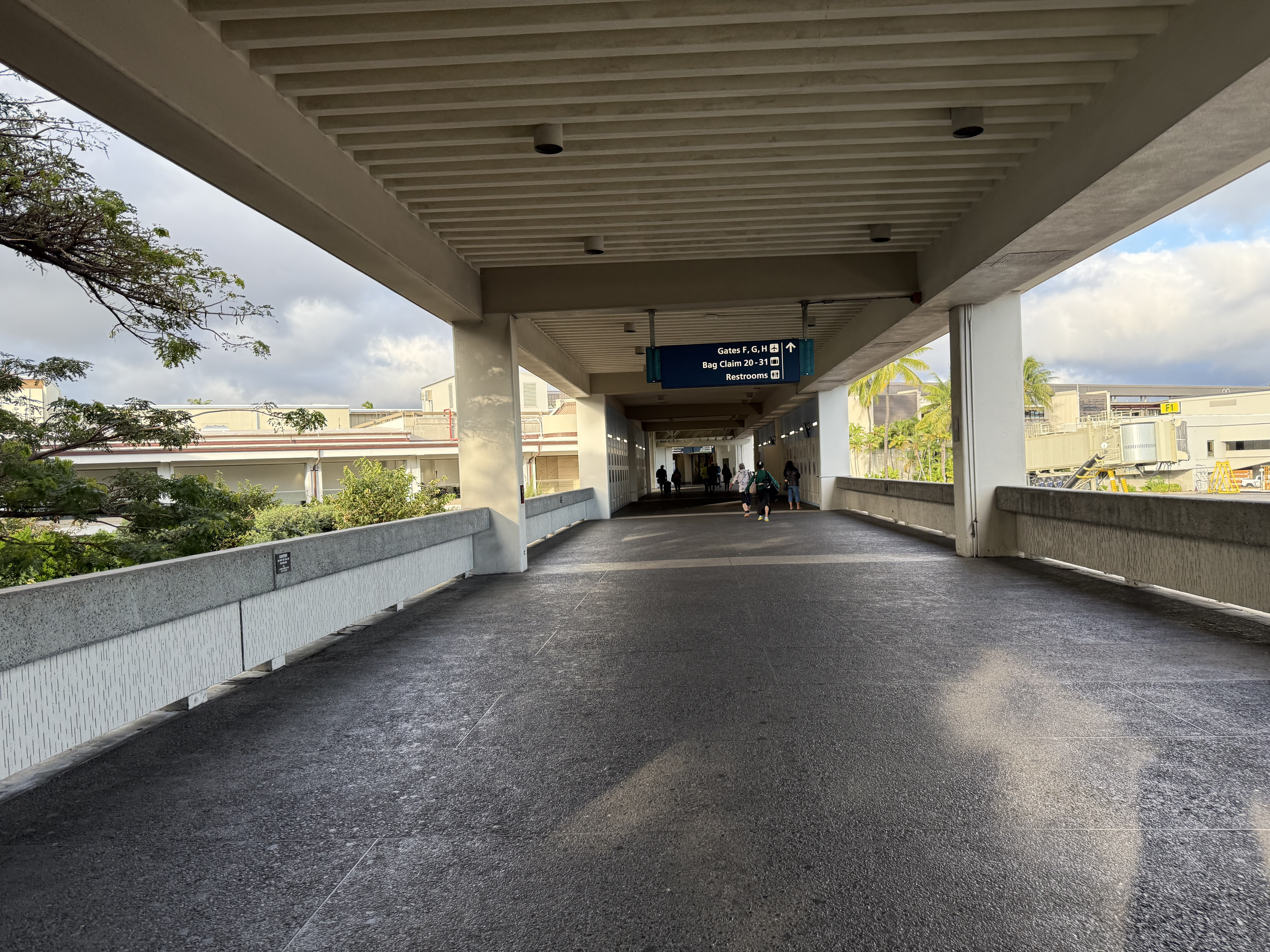
Terminal 2 Walkway to E Gates

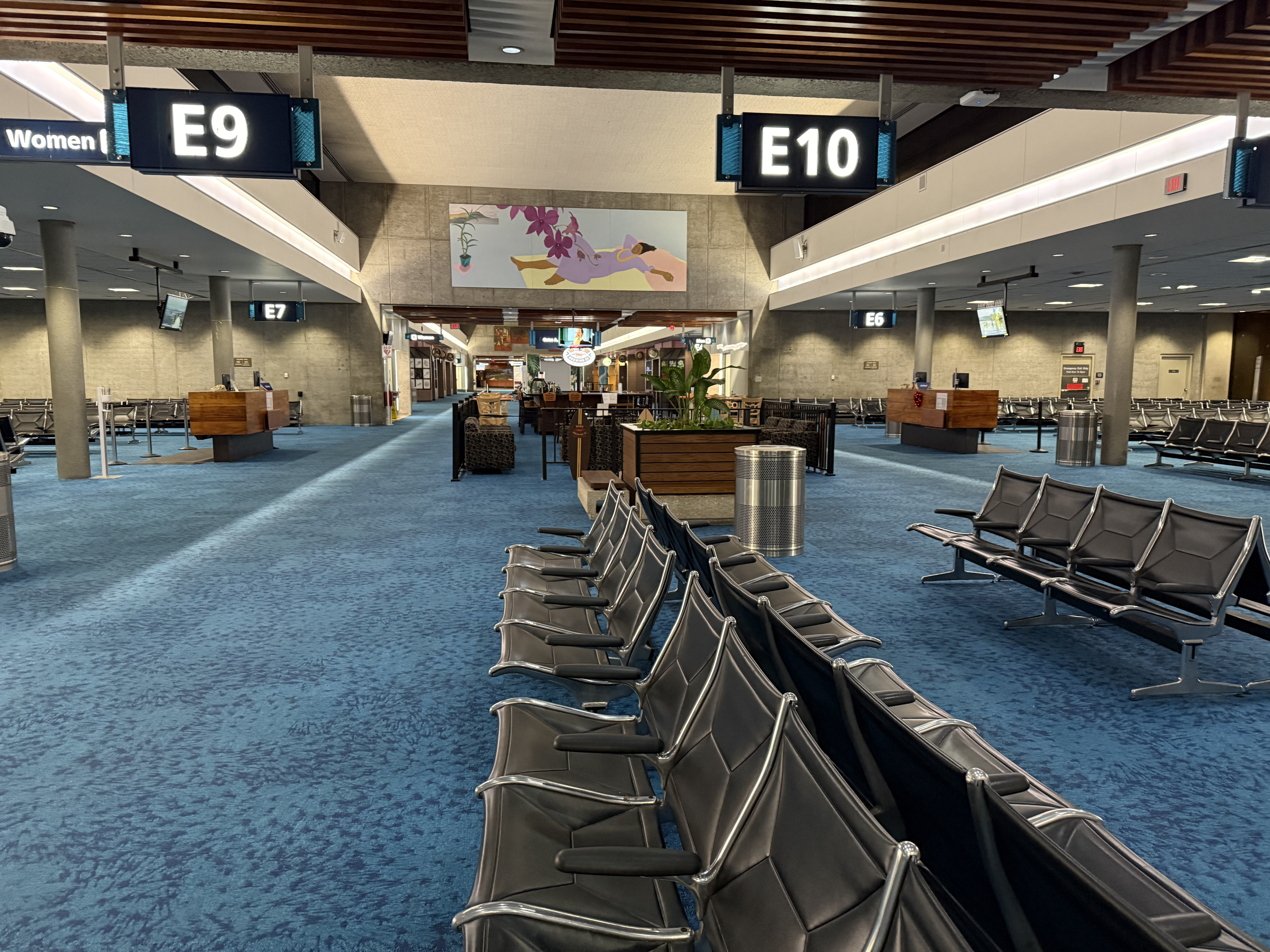
Terminal 2 E Gates

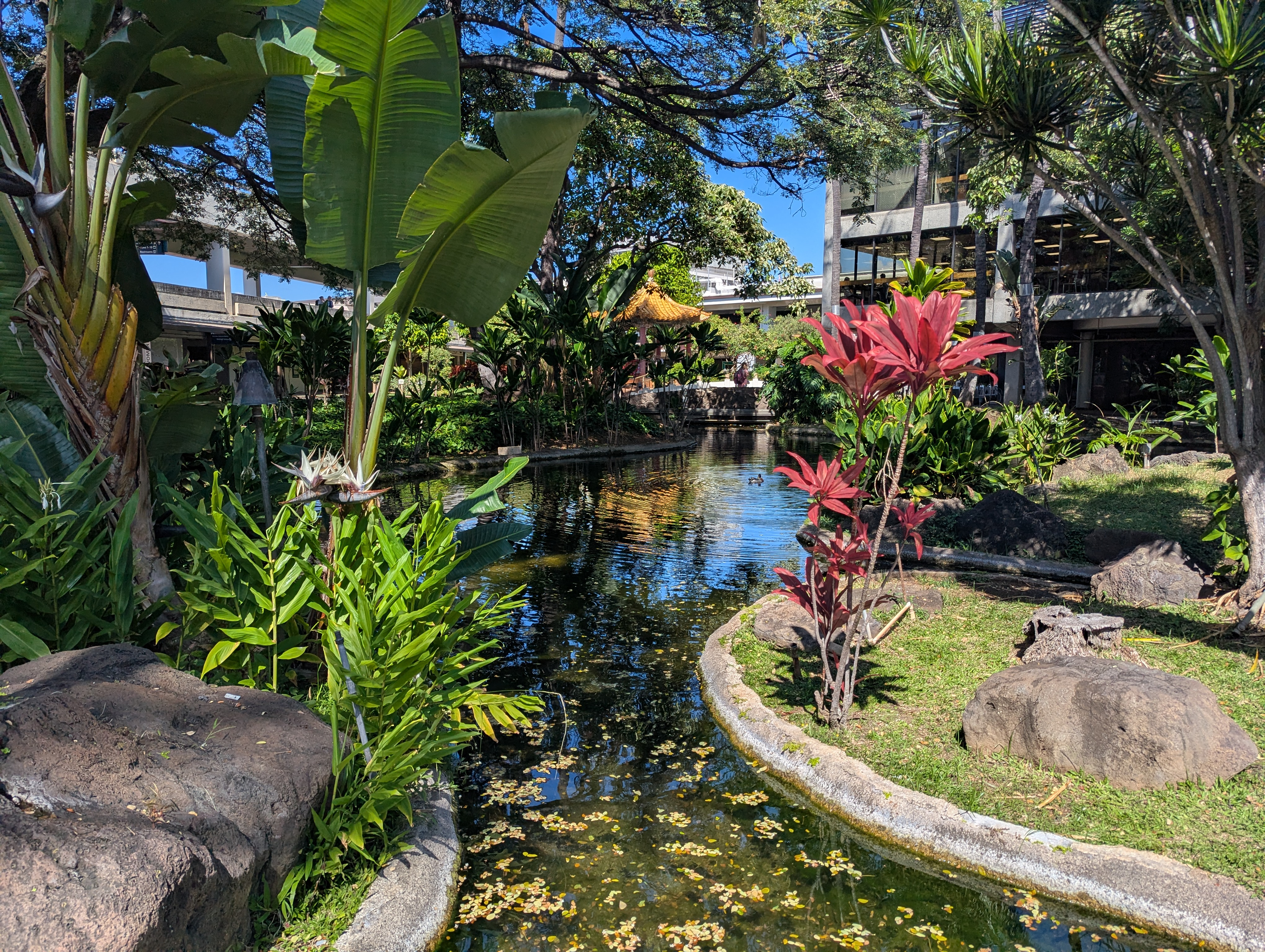
Hawaiian cultural garden
(view as a 360° interactive panorama)

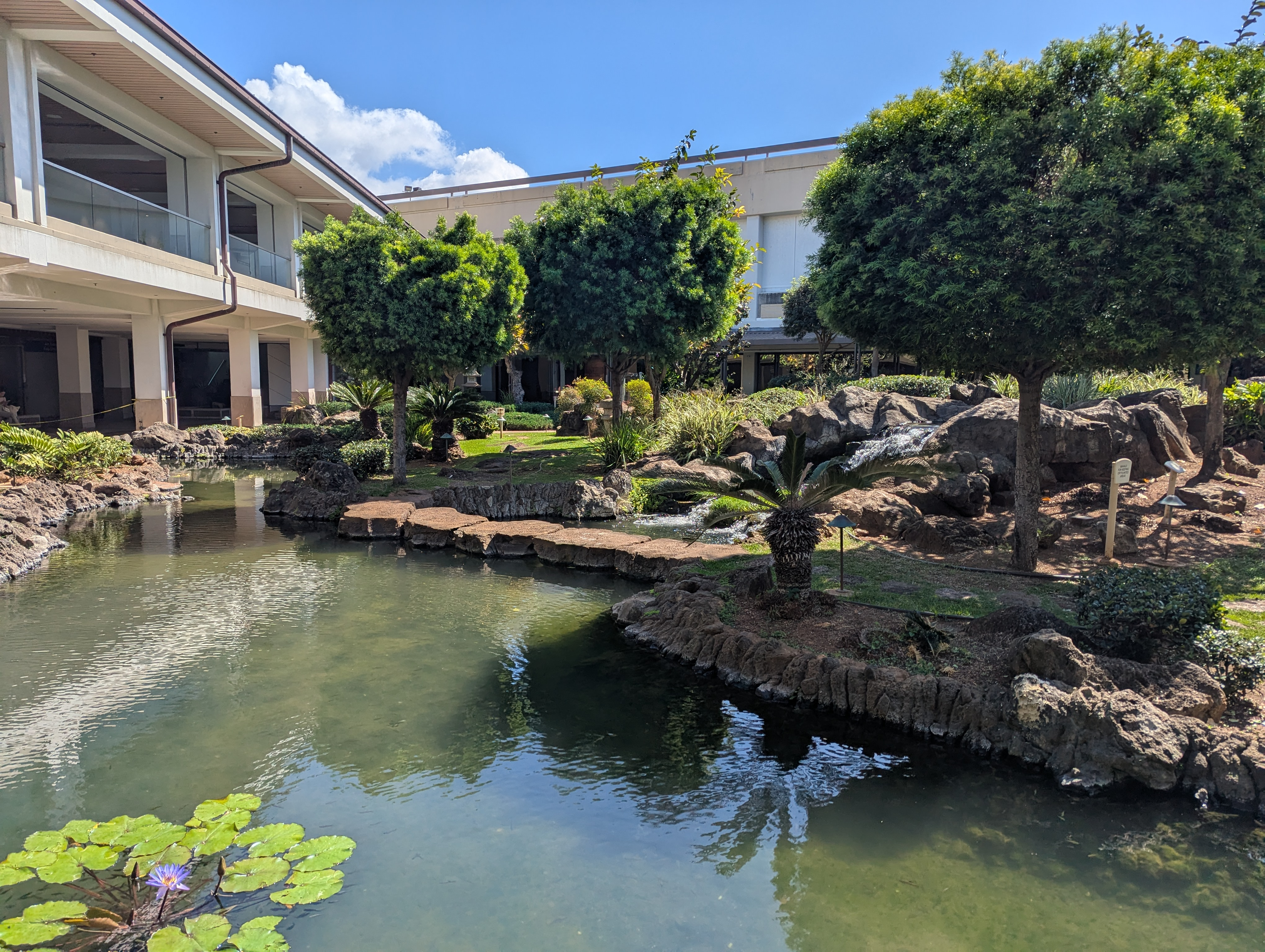
Japanese cultural garden
(view as a 360° interactive panorama)

Terminal 3 opened in 2018 between the Delta and United Cargo facilities on the Diamond Head side of the airport. The terminal was originally a single-story facility located north of Terminal 1 adjacent to Nimitz Highway, but this older facility was closed on June 1, 2018, for demolition in order to make way for the Mauka Concourse expansion of Terminal 1. Originally a larger replacement commuter terminal was planned to be built on the Diamond Head side of the airport, but those plans were ultimately canceled. This was largely due to bankruptcy of three of the four airlines occupying the terminal and the higher-than-expected cost of the project.

=== Ground transportation ===
The airport is accessible from both Interstate H-1 at exit 16 and Nimitz Highway.

TheBus W Line serves the airport on the ground level, at the Daniel K. Inouye International Airport Skyline Station. This limited-stop route connects the airport to Downtown Honolulu, Ala Moana Center, and Waikiki via Nimitz Highway/Ala Moana Boulevard. Routes 40, 42, and 51 run on Nimitz Highway within walking distance of the airport, serving the Skyline station directly on late-night trips.

Skyline, the light metro system serving the City and County of Honolulu, provides service to airport via the Daniel K. Inouye International Airport station after Segment 2 opened in October 2025. The station is between terminal 1 & terminal 2 near the international parking garage.

The Wiki Wiki Shuttle, the airport's free shuttle bus, provides service between the ticket lobbies of all three terminals, and between the concourses of Terminal 1 and Terminal 2 post-security.

A 1,800,000 square feet (170,000 m^{2}), $377 million consolidated rental car facility (CONRAC) opened on December 1, 2021, consolidating all rental car companies into one shared facility of 4,500 parking spaces across five levels.

== Airlines and destinations ==
=== Passenger ===
Airlines	Destinations
Air Canada	Vancouver; Seasonal: Toronto–Pearson
Air New Zealand	Auckland
Air Premia	Seoul–Incheon
Alaska Airlines	Anchorage, Kahului, Ontario, Salt Lake City, San Diego, Seattle/Tacoma; Seasonal: Boise (begins December 17, 2026), Burbank, Spokane (begins December 19, 2026)
All Nippon Airways	Tokyo–Haneda, Tokyo–Narita
American Airlines	Dallas/Fort Worth, Los Angeles, Phoenix–Sky Harbor; Seasonal: Chicago–O'Hare
Delta Air Lines	Atlanta, Detroit, Los Angeles, Minneapolis/St. Paul, New York–JFK, Salt Lake City, Seattle/Tacoma, Tokyo–Haneda; Seasonal: Boston (resumes December 19, 2026)
Fiji Airways	Apia–Faleolo, Kiritimati, Nadi
Hawaiian Airlines	Hilo, Kahului, Kailua-Kona, Las Vegas, Lihue, Long Beach, Los Angeles, New York–JFK, Oakland, Osaka–Kansai, Pago Pago, Papeete, Phoenix–Sky Harbor, Portland (OR), Rarotonga, Sacramento, San Diego, San Francisco, San Jose (CA), Seattle/Tacoma, Sydney, Tokyo–Haneda
Japan Airlines	Nagoya–Centrair, Osaka–Kansai, Tokyo–Haneda, Tokyo–Narita
Korean Air	Seoul–Incheon
Mokulele Airlines	Kalaupapa, Kapalua, Lanai, Molokai
Philippine Airlines	Manila
Qantas	Sydney
Southwest Airlines	Burbank, Hilo, Kahului, Kailua-Kona, Las Vegas, Lihue, Long Beach, Los Angeles, Oakland, Ontario, Phoenix–Sky Harbor, Sacramento, San Diego, San Jose (CA)
United Airlines	Chicago–O'Hare, Chuuk, Denver, Guam, Houston–Intercontinental, Kosrae, Kwajalein, Los Angeles, Majuro, Pohnpei, San Francisco, Washington–Dulles; Seasonal: Newark
WestJet	Calgary, Vancouver; Seasonal: Edmonton
Zipair Tokyo	Tokyo–Narita

=== Cargo ===
Airlines	Destinations
UPS Airlines	Louisville

=== Fixed-base operators ===
A number of fixed-base operators are located along Lagoon Drive on the airport's southeastern perimeter. While these focus on general aviation services, there are a few small passenger airline operations that operate from these facilities, rather than from the main terminal complex. Air tour flights typically depart from this area as well.

== Statistics ==
=== Top destinations ===
Busiest domestic routes from HNL (September 2025 – August 2026)
Rank	City	Passengers	Carriers
1	Los Angeles, California	1,131,360	Alaska, American, Delta, Hawaiian, Southwest, United
2	Kahului, Hawaii	953,606	Hawaiian, Southwest
3	Lihue, Hawaii	705,562	Hawaiian, Southwest
4	Kailua-Kona, Hawaii	676,087	Hawaiian, Southwest
5	Hilo, Hawaii	651,911	Hawaiian, Southwest
6	San Francisco, California	565,456	Alaska, Hawaiian, United
7	Seattle/Tacoma, Washington	547,741	Alaska, Delta, Hawaiian
8	Las Vegas, Nevada	436,087	Hawaiian, Southwest
9	San Diego, California	309,412	Alaska, Hawaiian, Southwest
10	Phoenix, Arizona	256,398	American, Hawaiian, Southwest

Busiest international routes from HNL (September 2025 – August 2026)
Rank	Airport	Passengers	Carriers
1	Tokyo–Haneda, Japan	949,704	All Nippon Airways, Delta, Hawaiian, Japan Airlines
2	Tokyo–Narita, Japan	770,532	All Nippon Airways, Hawaiian, Japan Airlines, Zipair Tokyo
3	Seoul–Incheon, South Korea	376,413	Asiana Airlines, Hawaiian, Korean Airlines
4	Osaka—Kansai, Japan	301,360	Hawaiian, Japan Airlines
5	Vancouver, Canada	263,404	Air Canada, WestJet
6	Sydney, Australia	234,737	Hawaiian, Jetstar, Qantas
7	Nagoya-Centrair, Japan	111,112	Japan Airlines
8	Manila, Philippines	110,971	Philippine Airlines
9	Auckland, New Zealand	95,524	Air New Zealand, Hawaiian
10	Majuro, Marshall Islands	45,813	United

=== Airline market share ===
Largest airlines at HNL (September 2025 – August 2026)
Rank	Airline	Passengers	Share
1	Alaska Airlines	6,551,818	32.0%
2	Hawaiian Airlines	3,025,120	14.8%
3	Southwest Airlines	2,885,122	14.1%
4	United Airlines	2,632,177	12.9%
5	Delta Air Lines	1,564,408	7.7%
–	Other	3,800,000	18.5%

=== Annual traffic ===
Annual passenger traffic (enplaned + deplaned) at HNL, 1991–present
Year	Passengers	Year	Passengers	Year	Passengers	Year	Passengers
1991	22,224,594	2001	20,151,935	2011	17,991,497	2021	12,064,992
1992	22,608,188	2002	19,749,902	2012	19,291,412	2022	18,346,044
1993	22,061,953	2003	18,690,888	2013	19,776,751	2023	21,188,678
1994	22,995,976	2004	19,334,674	2014	19,972,910	2024	21,873,751
1995	23,672,894	2005	20,179,634	2015	19,869,707	2025	21,985,522
1996	24,326,737	2006	20,266,686	2016	19,950,125		
1997	23,880,346	2007	21,517,476	2017	21,232,359		
1998	22,636,354	2008	18,809,103	2018	21,145,521		
1999	22,560,399	2009	18,171,937	2019	21,870,691		
2000	23,027,674	2010	18,443,873	2020	6,656,825		

== Accidents and incidents ==
- On March 22, 1955, a United States Navy Douglas R6D-1 Liftmaster transport on descent to a landing in darkness and heavy rain strayed off course and crashed into Pali Kea Peak in the southern part of Oahu's Waianae Range, killing all 66 people on board. It remains the worst air disaster in Hawaii's history and the deadliest heavier-than-air accident in the history of U.S. naval aviation.
- Vickers Viscount N7410 of Aloha Airlines was damaged beyond repair when it collided on the ground with Douglas DC-9-31 N906H of Hawaiian Airlines on June 27, 1969.
- On August 8, 1971, Vickers Viscount N7415 of Aloha Airlines was damaged beyond economic repair when a fire broke out upon landing.
- On July 2, 2021, Transair Flight 810, a Boeing 737-275C, registered as N810TA, en route to Kahului Airport, ditched into the ocean shortly after departure near Ewa Beach. The aircraft had suffered an engine failure. The two pilots on board were rescued by the United States Coast Guard with minor injuries.
- On December 17, 2024, Kamaka Air Flight 689, a Cessna 208, crashed into an abandoned building near the airport. The 2 people on board were killed.

== See also ==
- Island Hopper scheduled air service
- List of airports in Hawaii
