= Aloha IslandAir Flight 1712 =

1989 aviation accident in Hawaiʻi

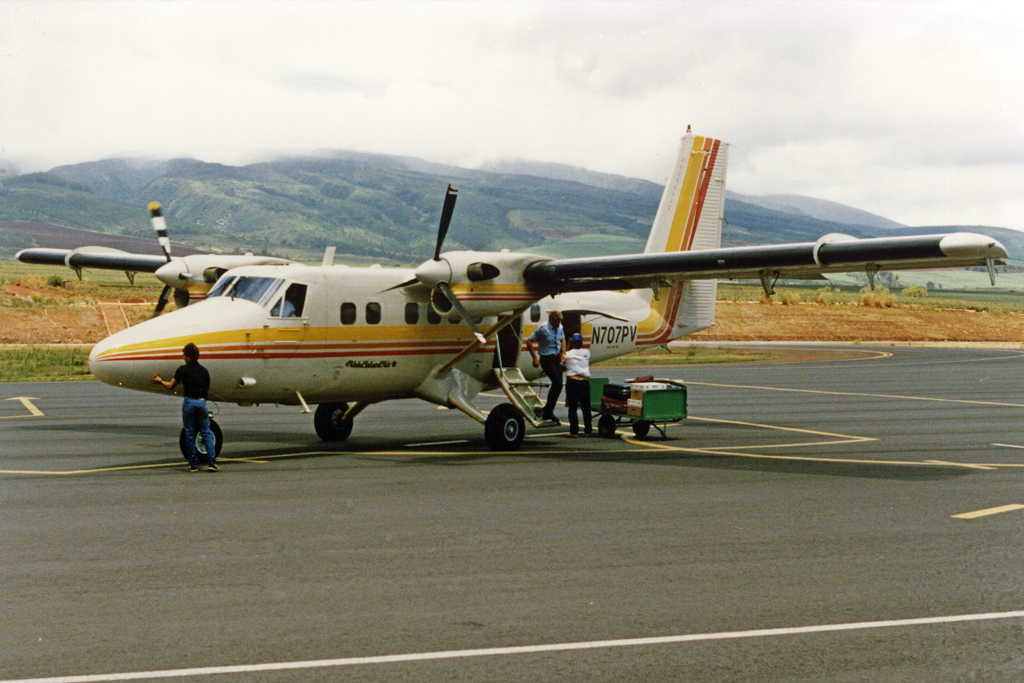
- N707PV, the involved aircraft in 1988

Accident
- Date: October 28, 1989
- Summary: Controlled flight into terrain
- Site: Near Hālawa Valley, Molokaʻi, Hawaiʻi, United States; 21.16668°N 156.743277°W

Aircraft
- Aircraft type: de Havilland Canada DHC-6 Twin Otter 300
- Operator: Aloha IslandAir
- IATA flight No.: WP1712
- ICAO flight No.: MKU1712
- Call sign: MOKU 1712
- Registration: N707PV
- Flight origin: Hana Airport, Hana, Hawaiʻi, United States
- 1st stopover: Kahului Airport, Maui, Hawaiʻi, United States
- Last stopover: Molokaʻi Airport, Molokaʻi, Hawaiʻi, United States
- Destination: Honolulu International Airport, Oʻahu, Hawaiʻi, United States
- Occupants: 20
- Passengers: 18
- Crew: 2
- Fatalities: 20
- Survivors: 0

Aloha IslandAir Flight 1712 was a scheduled domestic passenger flight that took place on October 28, 1989. The flight originated in Hana Airport, Maui, Hawaiʻi and stopped over in Kahului Airport, Maui. It was scheduled to continue to Molokaʻi Airport, Molokaʻi and then to Honolulu International Airport; however, it crashed while enroute from Kahului to Molokaʻi. The leg in which the aircraft crashed was expected to take 25 minutes, on visual flight rules under provisions of 14 CFR Part 135. The aircraft struck terrain at 600 feet (180 m), and at a heading of 260° near Hālawa Valley, Hawaii. Both crew members and all 18 passengers died in the accident. The National Transportation Safety Board (NTSB) determined the cause of the accident was by pilot error.

== Background ==
=== Aircraft ===
The aircraft involved, manufactured in 1973, was a de Havilland Canada DHC-6 Twin Otter 300 registered as N707PV with serial number 400. It was first delivered to Sun Valley Key Airlines on December 18, 1973. It was sold to Aloha IslandAir on March 10, 1988, and started service during November of the same year. The aircraft was powered by two Pratt & Whitney Canada PT6A-27 engines and had logged 19,875 flight hours in 30,139 takeoff and landing cycles.

=== Crew ===
In command was 30-year-old Captain Bruce Antonio Pollard. He started his aviation career at Aloha IslandAir with Princeville Airways, which was eventually formed into Aloha IslandAir. He started as a ramp agent, and then became a first officer in April 1988. He upgraded to the role of captain just 15 months later in August 1989. The captain had one other incident and one violation with the Federal Aviation Administration. The incident occurred in February 1986 with a Piper PA-28 Cherokee in Juneau, Alaska. Pollard lost horizontal directional control of his aircraft while on approach, and ground looped on the runway. The cause was determined to be malfunctioning brakes. The violation occurred four years prior to the crash of Flight 1712, when Pollard was determined by the Federal Aviation Administration to have violated 14 CFR Part 135, when he acted as pilot-in-command on five air taxi flights, despite the fact that he had not had proper certification, and for operating an aircraft in a careless or reckless matter. He had his commercial pilot licence suspended for six months. At the time of the accident, Pollard had logged 3,542 flight hours, 1,668 of which were logged on the Twin Otter 300. It was found out that Captain Pollard was accepted into Aloha Airlines and was training the previous two weeks to fly a Boeing 737. Therefore, he was extra fatigued.

Pollard's co-pilot was 27-year-old First Officer Philip Edwin Helfrich. His first position at the airline was also as a ramp agent, which started in July 1988. He began flight lessons in August 1987. With 62 flight hours, he received his private pilot licence and single-engine land rating only three months after, on November 11, 1987. He continued with flight lessons, whilst building stature in the airline by continuing with his ramp agent position. Seventeen months after receiving his PPL, with 233 flight hours logged, he received his commercial pilot licence, with single and multi-engine land and instrument ratings. Aloha IslandAir hired him as a first officer in August 1989, and completed a 14 CFR Part 135.297 flight check the same month. At the time of the accident, he had logged 425 flight hours, including 189 logged on the Twin Otter 300.

=== Passengers ===
The 18 passengers included 5 girls' volleyball team players and their head coach, 3 boys' volleyball team players, and the athletic director of Molokaʻi High School. There were also 4 Hawaiʻi locals onboard, 2 passengers from Pennsylvania and 2 passengers from Texas. No cabin crew were onboard, as they are not required for CFR Part 135 airlines.

== Accident ==
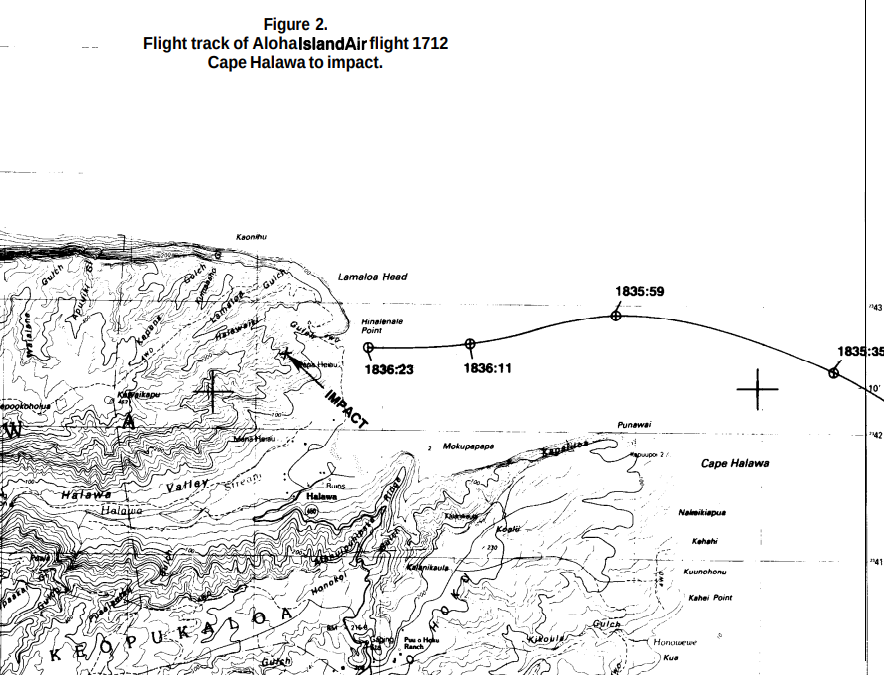
The flight path of Flight 1712

Earlier on the day of the accident, the same crew flew six uneventful inter-island flights on the same aircraft. Flight 1712 operated from Hana Airport, to Kahului Airport, and was scheduled to continue to Molokaʻi Airport, and to terminate at Honolulu International Airport. The aircraft arrived at Kahului from Hana at 18:15 local time. The sun had set 22 minutes earlier, at 17:53 local time. The flight departed Kahului Airport for Molokaʻi Airport at 18:25 local time while flying under the visual flight rules. Twelve minutes later, at approximately 18:37 local time, while the aircraft maintained an altitude of about 600 feet with 150 knots (280 km/h; 170 mph), the aircraft impacted mountainous terrain killing everyone onboard. After disappearing from radar, the flight was officially declared missing at around 19:30 local time. The wreck was found the next morning at 06:25, within the mountains near Hālawa Valley at an elevation of about 600 feet (180 m).

== Cause ==
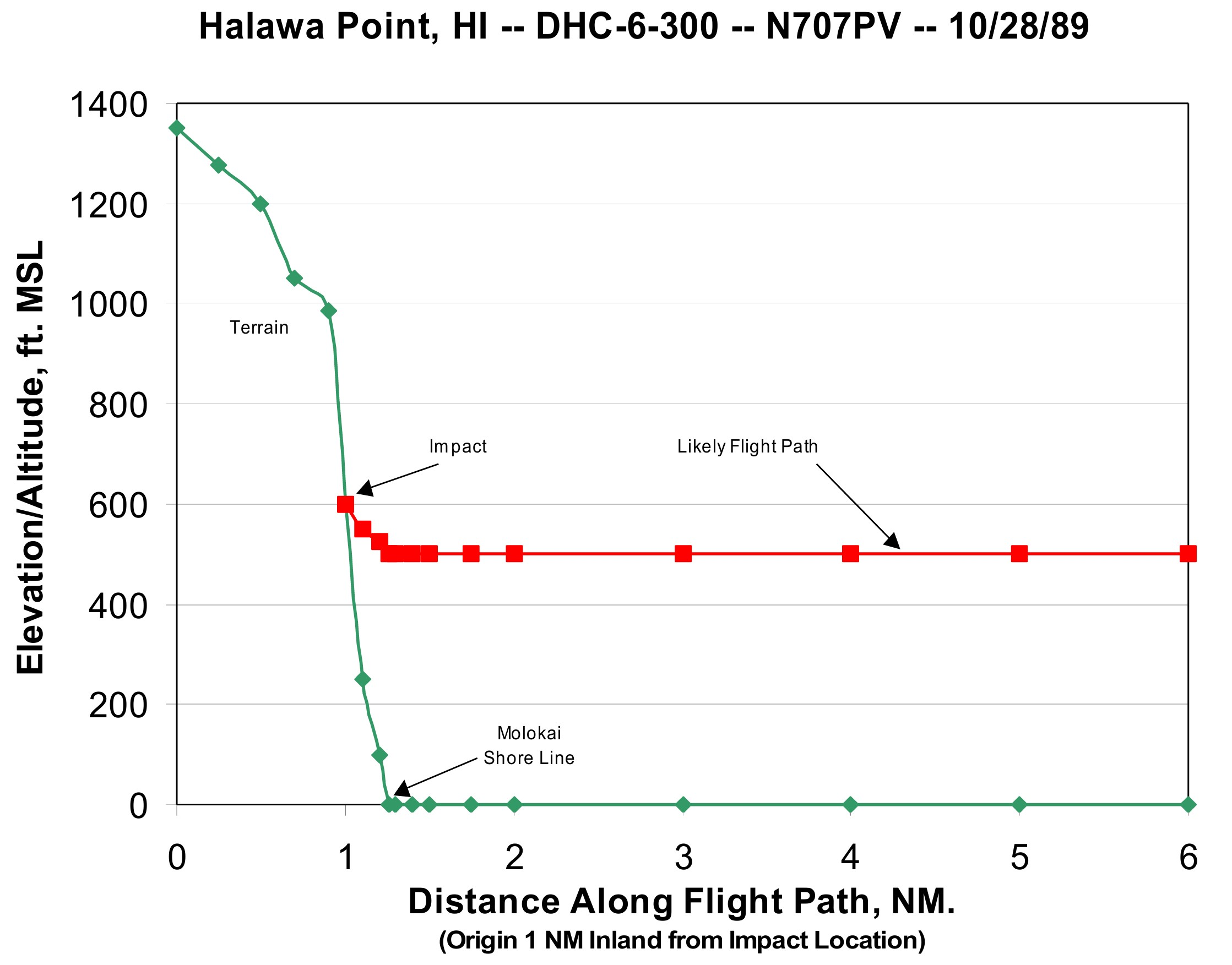
Altitude profile of Flight 1712

On September 25, 1990, the National Transportation Safety Board released the final report of this accident. They determined that the probable cause of the accident was the decision of Captain Pollard to continue flying under the visual flight rules despite flying into instrument meteorological conditions at night, which obscured rising mountainous terrain which led to an eventual impact with the mountains. It was also found out that there were orographic clouds northeast of Molokai and that the information received by Captain Pollard about the weather forecast failed to include the possibility of low cloud conditions in the flight route. The flight would have been under the instrument flight rules (IFR) or deviated from the flight route, had Captain Pollard found out about the possibility of orographic clouds. The board also stated that the accident was influenced by Aloha IslandAir management's inadequate supervision of staff, training, and operations. Additionally, there was a lack of sufficient oversight from the Federal Aviation Administration (FAA) regarding Aloha IslandAir during a time of significant operational growth and expansion.

== Aftermath ==
Legal action was taken by the victims' families against Aloha Air Group (Aloha IslandAir's parent company) until 1994. A group of the victim's families that received settlements subsequently used the money to establish a scholarship fund to benefit students at Molokaʻi High School.

== See also ==
- American Airlines Flight 965
- Santa Bárbara Airlines Flight 518
- Trigana Air Flight 267
