= Island Air (Hawaii) =

Airline of the United States

IATA	ICAO	Call sign
WP	MKU	MOKU
- Founded: 1980; 46 years ago (as Princeville Airways)
- Ceased operations: November 11, 2017; 8 years ago
- Hubs: Daniel K. Inouye International Airport (HNL; Formerly known as Honolulu International Airport)
- Secondary hubs: Kahului Airport (OGG)
- Focus cities: Honolulu (HNL), Kahului (OGG), Līhuʻe (LIH) and Kona (KOA)
- Frequent-flyer program: Island Miles (Formerly known as Cloud 9 & AlohaPass)
- Alliance: United Airlines, Aloha Airlines (Now Defunct)
- Fleet size: 3 Bombardier Q400 NextGen Turboprop Aircraft
- Destinations: 4
- Parent company: PacifiCap
- Headquarters: Honolulu, Hawaii
- Key people: David Uchiyama, President and CEO
- Employees: 400+

Island Air (officially Hawaii Island Air) was a commuter airline based in Honolulu, Hawaii. It operated scheduled inter-island passenger services in Hawaii. Its main base was the Daniel K. Inouye International Airport on Oahu.

The airline maintained a code share and frequent flyer agreement with United Airlines. Hawaiian Airlines halted its commercial relationship with Island Air in 2012 when it announced plans to begin operating ATR 42 regional turboprop airliners in the islands under its own brand. Island Air also operated its own frequent flyer program, Island Miles (formerly Cloud 9).

Island Air ceased all operations on 10 November 2017 after 37 years of service between Hawaii's islands, carrying 13% of intra-Hawaii seats in the first three quarters of 2017, competing against Hawaiian Airlines carrying 80%. For the second quarter of 2017, Island Air posted an operating loss of $4.9 million and a net loss of $8.2 million, and filed for Chapter 11 bankruptcy protection on 17 October as it couldn't find new investors to satisfy lessors Wells Fargo Bank Northwest and Elix 8 who want to repossess its five Bombardier Q400s, which replaced five ATRs.

== History ==
=== Princeville Airways ===
Island Air was incorporated in 1980 by Colorado-based Consolidated Oil and Gas as Princeville Airways. It began scheduled services on September 9, 1980, between Honolulu (HNL) and Princeville, Kauai (HPV) using two de Havilland Canada DHC-6 Twin Otter STOL capable turboprop aircraft. It served this initial regular commuter route between Princeville and Honolulu primarily for Princeville Resort guests. The airline then expanded its interisland routes with service to Hana, Maui; Hoolehua, Molokai; Kahului, Maui; Kamuela, Hawaii (Big Island); Kapalua, Maui (West Maui) and Lanai City, Lanai. The Princeville Airways fleet was expanded and eventually consisted of eight DHC-6 Twin Otter aircraft.

=== Aloha IslandAir ===
In May 1987, Consolidated Oil and Gas sold Princeville Airways to Aloha Air Group, the parent company of Aloha Airlines. Princeville Airways was renamed Aloha IslandAir and served the growing inter-island commuter market on behalf of Aloha Airlines on routes that could not justify larger Boeing 737-200 jetliners operated by Aloha. In June 1992, Aloha IslandAir registered the name Island Air as its trade name. In 1995, newly renamed Island Air was granted certification by the Federal Aviation Administration to operate larger aircraft to serve the burgeoning commuter market in Hawaii. In April of that year, Island Air took possession of its first thirty-seven seat de Havilland Canada DHC-8 Dash 8 aircraft.

=== Ownership under Gavarnie Holding, LLC ===
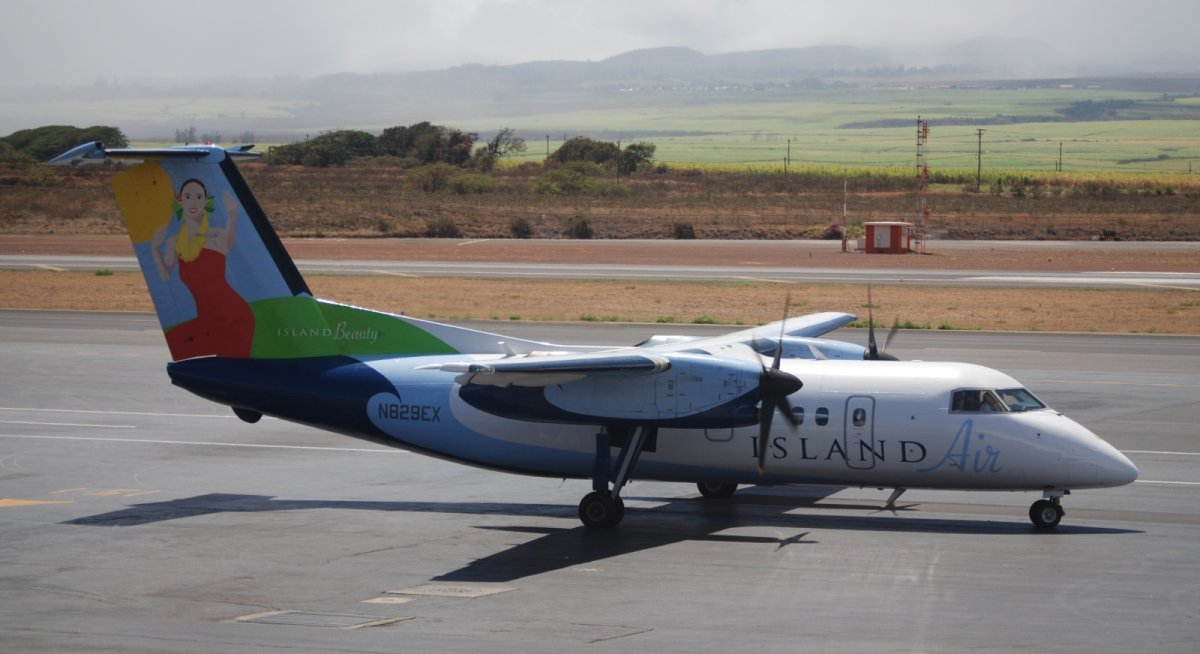
Dash 8-100 in the livery introduced in 2006

In December 2003, it was announced that Gavarnie Holding, LLC would purchase Aloha IslandAir from the Aloha AirGroup, making Island Air Hawaii's third largest independent airline. The purchase was completed on May 11, 2004, and the company was renamed Hawaii Island Air, Inc., although the airline continued to do business as "Island Air". After the purchase, Island Air expanded its business, acquiring more aircraft and flying new routes.

In May 2008, Island Air was awarded Essential Air Service routes from Kansas City International Airport to Joplin, Missouri, Grand Island, Nebraska, Harrison, Arkansas, and Hot Springs, Arkansas but did not announce specific starting dates. The following month, however, the airline withdrew from its contract after concluding that a mid-September startup date was unrealistic, citing staffing and fuel costs.

On August 17, 2009, Island Air discontinued all service to Hilo.

In 2012, as the Dash 8 fleet began to approach their useful cycle life, the airline reached out to PenAir of Alaska and wet leased a single Saab 340 turboprop aircraft for 10 months.

On July 19, 2012, Island Air revealed a new business model which included a complete image and brand overhaul. This coincided with the arrival of the airline's new ATR fleet of turboprop aircraft in August. The airline also unveiled a new website to go alongside its new brand and image launch.

On October 4, 2012, Les Murashige was appointed as the company's new president and CEO replacing Lesley Kaneshiro.

=== Ownership under Ohana Airline Holdings, LLC ===
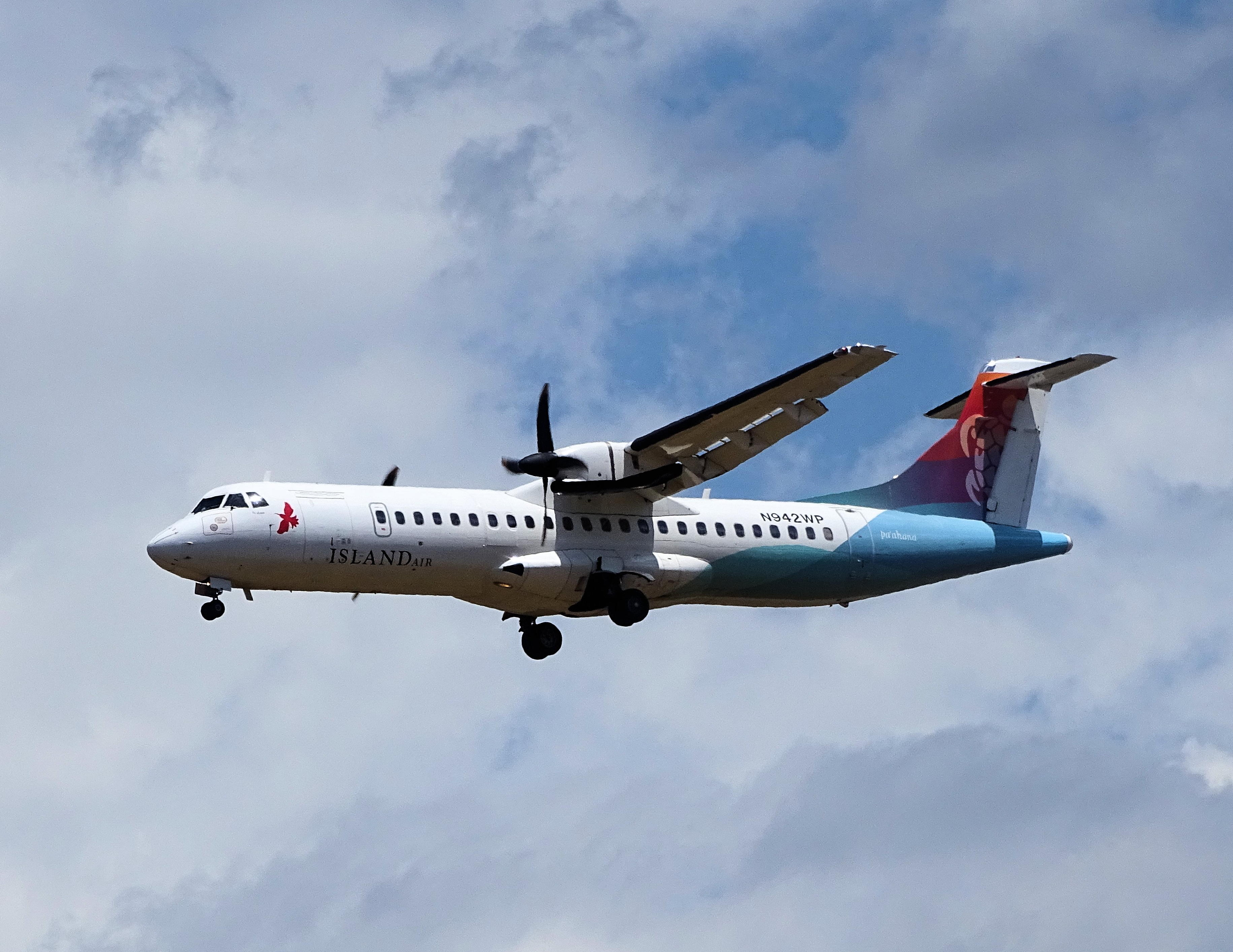
ATR 72 in 2014 livery

On January 10, 2013, Island Air announced that the company would be sold to an undisclosed buyer.

On January 18, 2013, Oracle Corporation CEO Larry Ellison, who had recently acquired most of the island of Lanai from David H. Murdock, was reported to be the buyer, though this was not confirmed by the airline at the time.

On February 26, 2013, the sale to Ellison was complete. That same day, the airline certified its first ATR 72, which would go into service the following day. Ellison appointed Paul Casey, former CEO of Hawaiian Airlines and President of the Hawaii Visitors and Convention Bureau as the company's new president and CEO.

On May 31, 2013, Island Air ended service to Kapalua/West Maui Airport, as a result of phasing out the airline's Dash 8 aircraft and the ATR 72's inability to land at the airport's short runway. In conjunction, service was resumed to Kahului, Maui on April 15, 2013.

In 2014, Island Air discontinued service to Ho'olehua, Molokai.

On September 3, 2014, in a surprise announcement, Island Air appointed David Pflieger, president and chief executive officer of Fort Lauderdale, Florida-based Silver Airways to assume the roles of president and chief executive officer. Effective October 1, 2014, Pflieger replaced former Hawaiian Airlines CEO Paul Casey who was asked to step down. Prior to Silver, Pflieger led the highly successful turnaround at Fiji Airways and was a former Virgin America and Delta Air Lines senior executive.

In December 2014, the airline announced that due to six quarters of prior losses under previous management, it was delaying delivery of new Bombardier Q400 propjet aircraft and also undertaking a comprehensive re-assessment of its fleet, network, and other aspects of its business.

On April 29, 2015, Island Air announced it would be eliminating Honolulu service to Kauai beginning June 1 and reducing daily frequency by more than half on its Lanai route starting on that date. The airline also announced it will be cutting its workforce by 20 percent as well as canceling delivery of new aircraft in the short term as the airline works to reposition itself as the second largest carrier in the islands. These changes come after the company cited record financial losses of more than $21 million last year alone.

In September 2015, Island Air began reporting its monthly and quarterly on-time performance and flight completion factor (80.4% and 99.2% respectively) so that current and potential customers can see how the airline is performing as it continues to improve and position itself for a strong future as Hawaii's alternative inter-island airline.

On January 7, 2016, Larry Ellison's Ohana Airline Holdings, LLC announced that it planned to sell a controlling interest in Island Air to PaCap Aviation Finance and Malama Investments, two investment companies managed by local investment firm, PacifiCap.

On February 8, 2016, following the formal approval of the transfer in ownership by the U.S. Department of Transportation, it was announced that Dave Pflieger, who joined as CEO in October 2014 and presided over its successful restructuring, turnaround, and sale, would be leaving Island Air to work directly for Ellison in an unspecified role and turning the reins back over to Les Murashige, a former Island Air executive, who would become president and CEO under the airline's new owners, PacifiCap LLC.

=== Ownership under PacifiCap ===
On January 21, 2016, Island Air announced plans to restore service to Kauai beginning on March 15 after suspending flights in June 2015 due to restructuring. The airline stated that approximately 32 airport-related jobs would be created and hinted that expansion aren't done yet with hopes to re-enter other destinations that Island Air previously served.

Island Air ended service to Lanai on March 31, 2016.

On April 14, 2016, Island Air announced its plans to restart service between Honolulu and Kona starting June 14 with five daily round-trip flights. The last time Island Air served Kona was in December 2012. This service restoration was estimated to create 25 new airport-related jobs. Island Air president and CEO Les Murashige stated that Hilo was also being evaluated.

On April 26, 2016, Island Air's CEO Les Murashige and COO Rob Mauracher stepped down from their posts. This was the second time in two months that Island Air had experienced a reshuffling of their senior management team. Shortly thereafter, Island Air named David Uchiyama as its new president and CEO.

On November 10, 2017, Island Air ceased operations after 37 years.

== Destinations ==
On its last days of operations, Island Air served the following destinations:

Island	City	Airport	Notes	Refs
Hawaii	Kailua-Kona	Kona International Airport		
Kauai	Lihue	Lihue Airport		
Maui	Kahului	Kahului Airport		
Oahu	Honolulu	Honolulu International Airport		

== Fleet ==
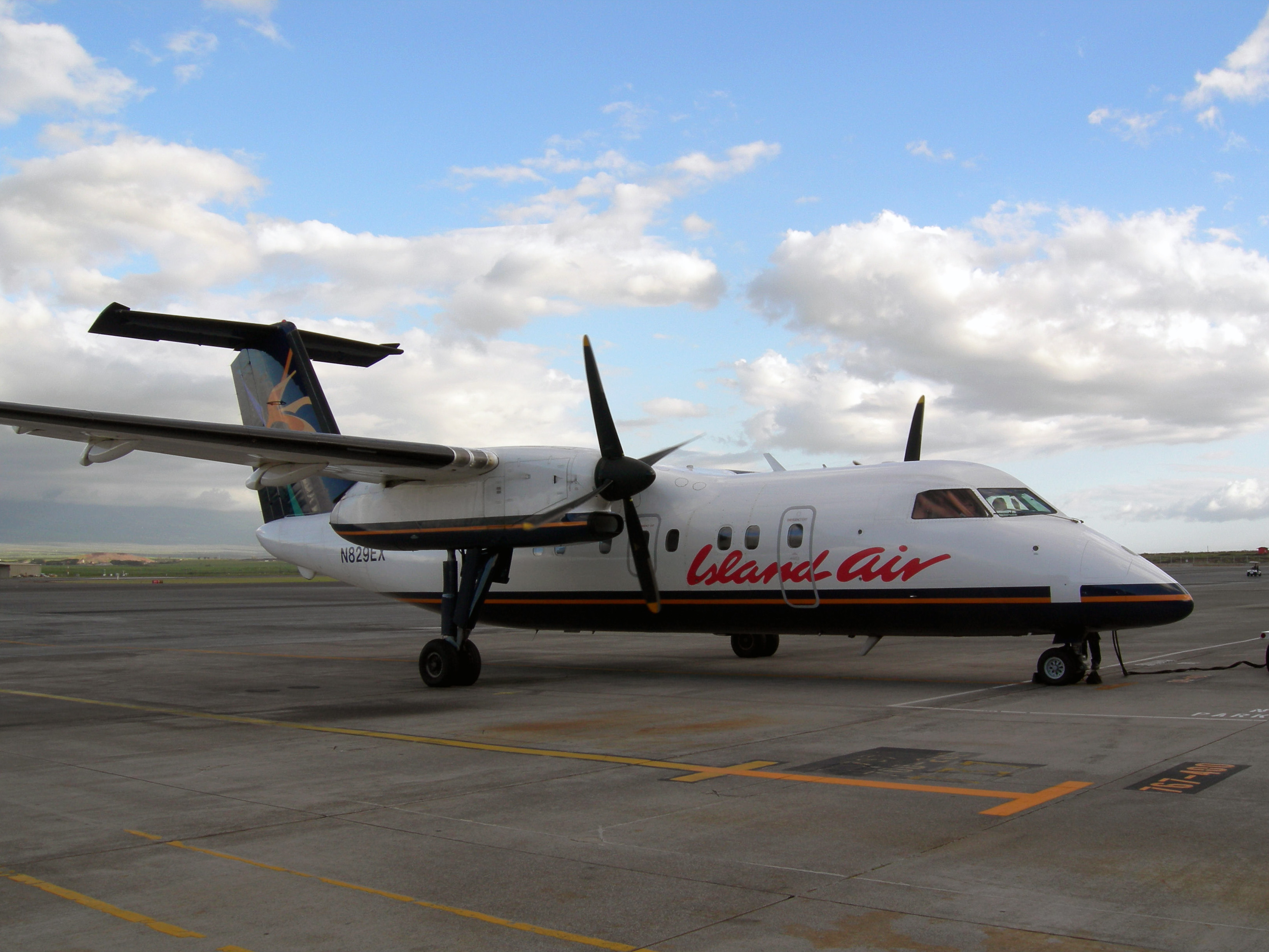
Dash 8-100 in the airline's pre-2006 livery

The airline took delivery of a Bombardier Q400 (N539DS) propjet in March 2006 via a five-year lease. In September 2006, the airline announced that it was withdrawing the aircraft from inter-island service the following month, with delivery of two additional Q400s rescheduled to 2007. The airline then returned all Q400 propjets and stated at the time that it had no plans to return these aircraft to service. However, the Q400 was eventually placed back into service by the airline.

Aviation Week & Space Technology reported on May 19, 2011, that the airline was looking to add one or two additional Dash 8 aircraft, and was also discussing new aircraft options with ATR, Fokker, Saab, and SuperJet International. The airline announced in late February 2012 that it had reached an agreement to lease six ATR 72 regional turboprop aircraft, along with a smaller Saab 340 turboprop wet leased from PenAir. The airline stated in July 2012 that deliveries of ATR 42 and ATR 72 aircraft would begin the following month.

After acquiring the ATR 72 aircraft, Island Air found them to be unreliable to the point that the airline was reviewing potential replacements as of September 2013. On March 31, 2014, Island Air placed firm orders for two Bombardier Dash 8 Q400 regional turboprop aircraft with the intention of replacing the ATR 72 with Q400.

Due to record financial losses of more than $21 million, on April 29, 2015, Island Air announced its intention to cancel the delivery of new Bombardier Dash 8 Q400 aircraft in the short term as the airline attempted to reposition itself as the second largest air carrier in the Hawaiian islands.

The interisland air carrier was operating Bombardier Q400 turboprop aircraft at the time of its shutdown.

== Accidents and incidents ==
On October 28, 1989, a de Havilland Canada DHC-6 Twin Otter operating as Aloha IslandAir Flight 1712 crashed into a mountainous terrain killing 20 people. The National Transportation Safety Board determined that the probable cause of this accident was the airplane's controlled flight into terrain as a result of the decision of the captain to continue flight under visual flight rules at night into instrument meteorological conditions, which obscured rising mountainous terrain.

== Services ==
=== Island Miles ===
Island Miles (formerly Cloud 9) was the travel rewards program of Island Air. The program's airline partners included Star Alliance member United Airlines. Island Air also had an interline agreement with American Airlines. Aloha Airlines was formerly an airline partner until it discontinued passenger operations.

The Island Miles program had no membership fee and flight credits were valid for three years following the date of the flight. Island Miles accounts which did not earn any flight credits for two years could be placed on "inactive status" and any credits on the account would have been forfeited. After six flight segments, a one-way award ticket was credited to the member, and after 12 flight credits, a round trip award ticket.
