= Aloha Air Cargo =

Cargo airline of the United States

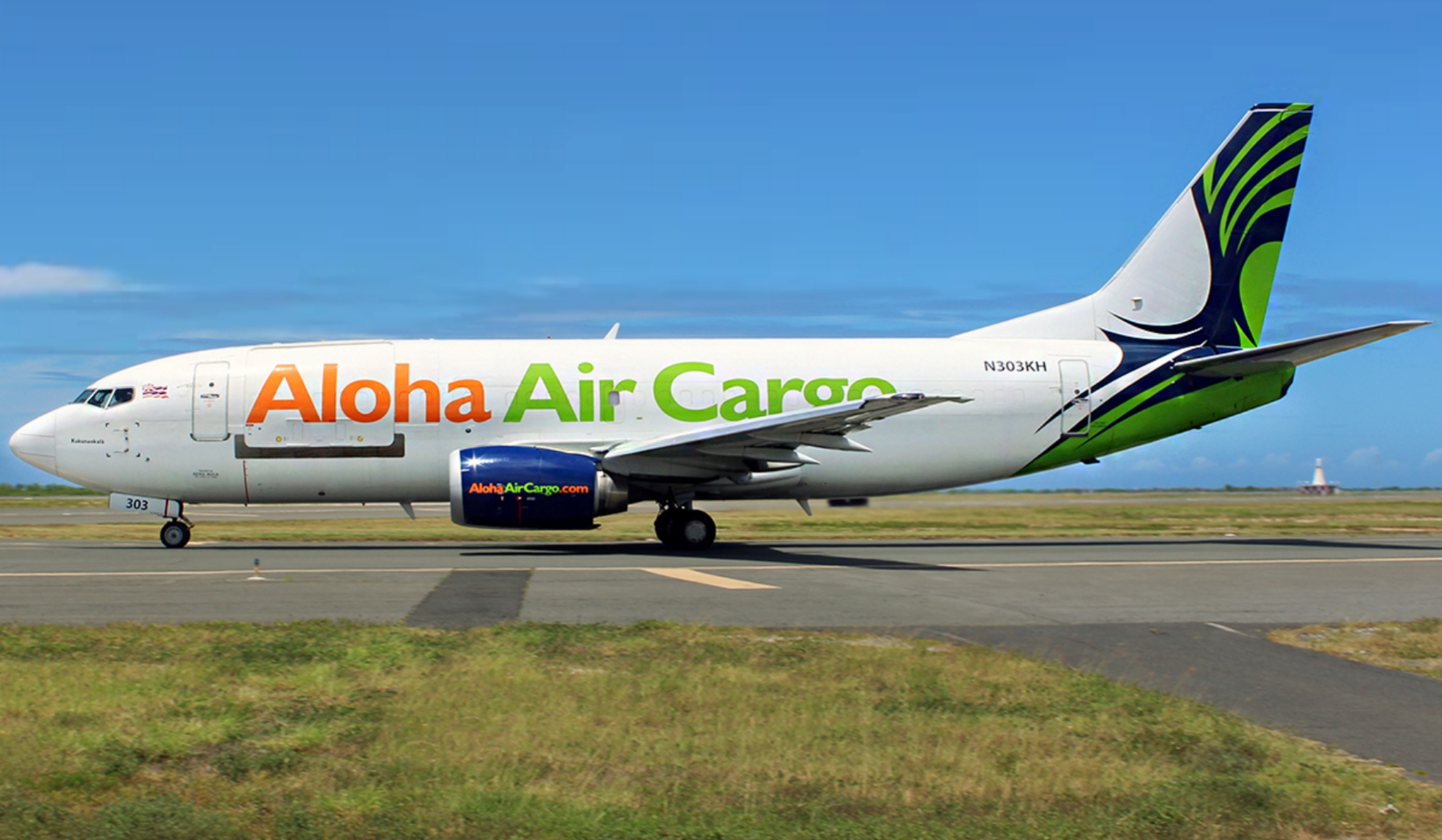
| IATA | ICAO | Call sign |
|---|---|---|
| KH | AAH | ALOHA |
- Founded: July 26, 1946; 80 years ago (as Trans-Pacific Airlines)
- Commenced operations: May 15, 2008; 18 years ago (spinoff from the collapsed Aloha Airlines)
- AOC #: TSAA174M
- Hubs: Daniel K. Inouye International Airport
- Subsidiaries: Aloha Tech Ops
- Fleet size: 6
- Destinations: 5
- Parent company: Northern Aviation Services; Saltchuk Resources, Inc.
- Headquarters: Honolulu, Hawaii
- Key people: Betsy Seaton (President & CEO)
- Website: alohaaircargo.com

Aeko Kula, LLC, operating as Aloha Air Cargo, is an all-cargo airline in the United States, headquartered in Honolulu, Hawaii, operating from a hub at Daniel K. Inouye International Airport. Formerly Aloha Airlines, it became an independent cargo operator following the closure of the passenger airline in 2008.

== History ==
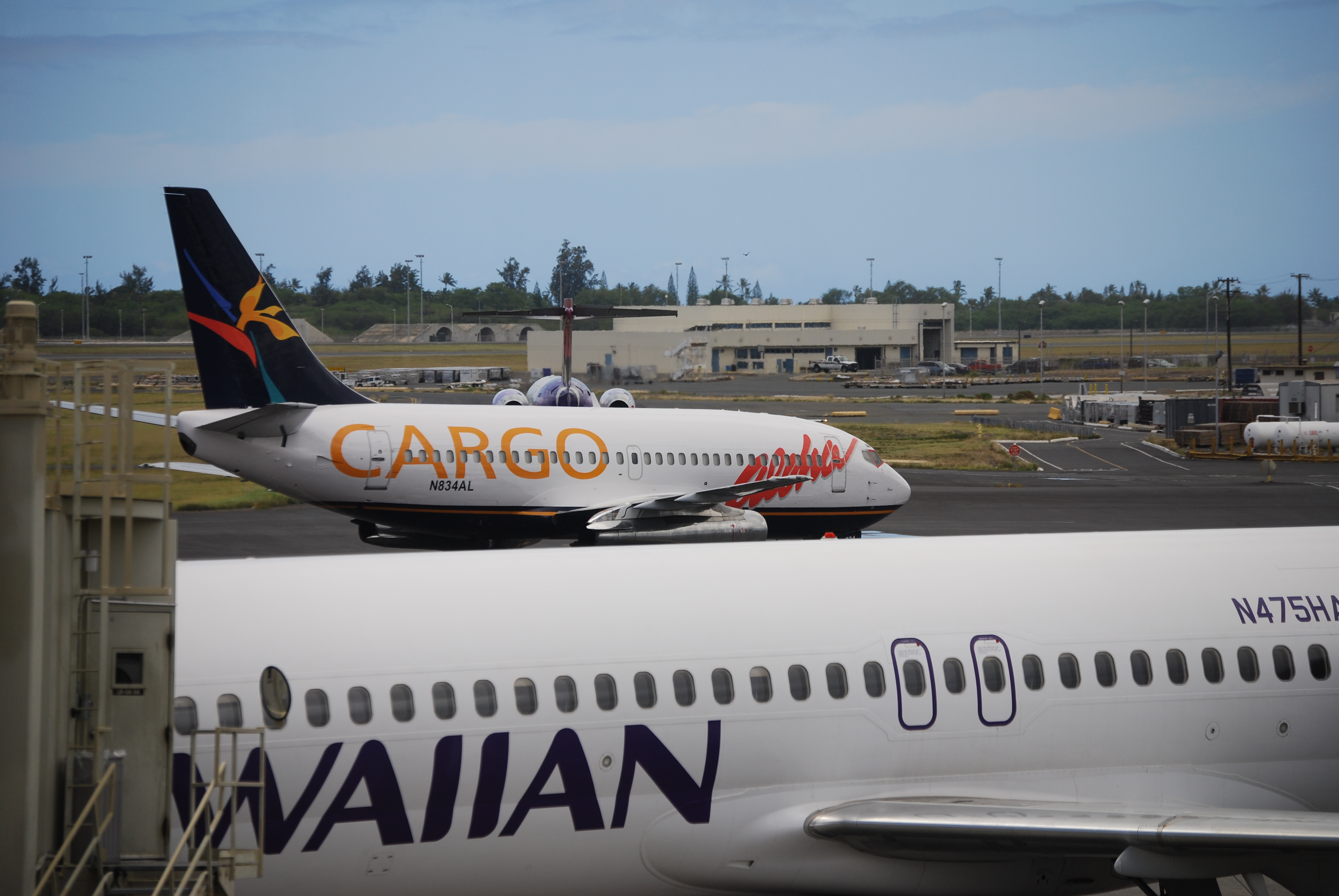
The airlines was originally as Aloha Cargo

Aloha Airlines was formed in 1946 and expanded over the next few decades. It filed for Chapter 11 bankruptcy protection in the United States Bankruptcy Court for the District of Hawaii in 2004 in an attempt to cut costs and remain competitive with other airlines serving Hawaii. Following approval of new labor contracts and securing additional investment from new investors, the airline emerged from bankruptcy protection on February 17, 2006. The airline filed for Chapter 11 bankruptcy protection again on March 20, 2008. Ten days later, on March 30, 2008, Aloha Airlines announced the suspension of all scheduled passenger flights, with the final day of operation to be March 31, 2008.

After the shutdown of passenger operations, Aloha and its creditors sought to auction off its profitable cargo and contract services division. Several companies expressed interest in purchasing Aloha's cargo division, including Seattle-based Saltchuk Resources, California-based Castle & Cooke Aviation, and Hawaii-based Kahala Capital (which included Richard Ing, a minority investor in the Aloha Air Group and member of Aloha's board of directors). However, a disagreement between cargo division bidders and Aloha's primary lender, GMAC Commercial Finance, ended with the bidders dropping out of the auction. Almost immediately afterwards, GMAC halted all funding to Aloha's cargo division, forcing all cargo operations to cease; at the same time, Aloha's board of directors decided to convert its Chapter 11 bankruptcy reorganization filing into a Chapter 7 bankruptcy liquidation.

Saltchuk Resources decided to renew its bid to purchase the cargo division at the urging of U.S. Senator Daniel Inouye, and a deal between Aloha and Saltchuk was struck and approved by the federal bankruptcy court, where Saltchuk would purchase the cargo division for $10.5 million. The sale was approved by federal Bankruptcy Judge Lloyd King on May 12, 2008, with the sale expected to close two days later.

Prior to its bid for Aloha, Saltchuk Resources was already present in Hawaii through its subsidiaries Young Brothers/Hawaiian Tug & Barge, Hawaii Fuel Network, Maui Petroleum, and Minit Stop Stores. The company also owns Northern Air Cargo, Alaska's largest cargo airline. A new subsidiary, Aeko Kula, LLC., was set up by Saltchuk to operate Aloha Air Cargo.

On May 15, 2008, the airline received its FAA and Department of Transport authority to operate as an independent airline. The airline went through a big transformation in the first two years of operation. The airline's first president, Mike Malik, rebranded the airline, launched a host of new products and services, and established "Aloha Tech Ops", the MRO division. During this time, the airline won numerous awards and was named Hawaii's Cargo Airline of the year for 2008.

== Destinations ==
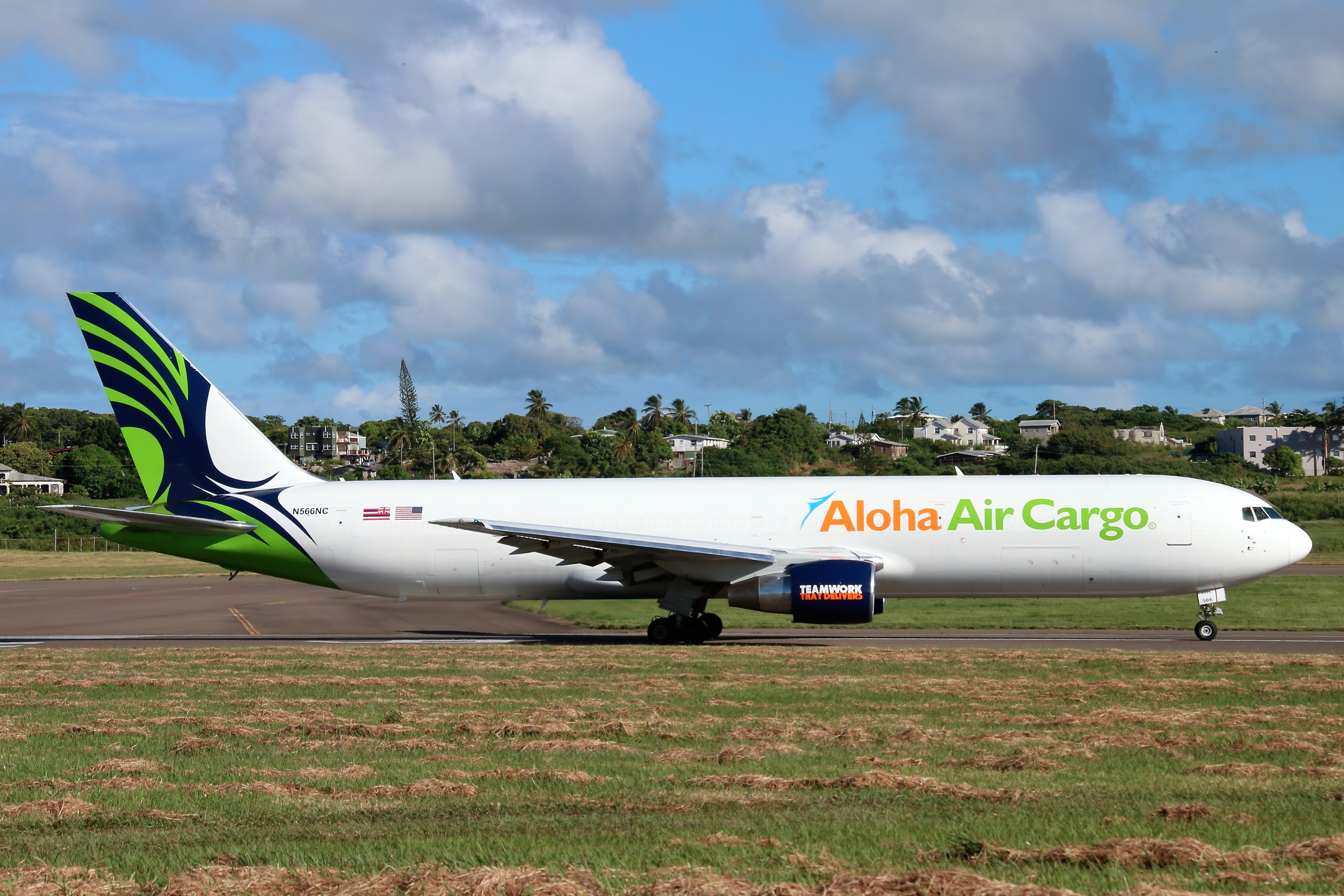
A Boeing 767-300 at Barbados.

As of November 2025, Aloha Air Cargo operates to the following domestic destinations:

Hawaii

- Hilo (Hilo International Airport)
- Honolulu (Daniel K. Inouye International Airport) Hub
- Kahului (Kahului Airport)
- Kona (Kona International Airport)
- Lihue (Lihue Airport)

== Fleet ==
=== Currently operating ===
As of August 2025, Aloha Air Cargo operates the following aircraft:

Aloha Air Cargo fleet
| Aircraft | Total | Orders | Notes |
|---|---|---|---|
| Boeing 737-300(SF) | 4 | — | |
| Boeing 737-400(SF) | 2 | 1 | |
| Total | 6 | 1 | |

=== Previously operated ===
The airline previously operated the following aircraft:

| Aircraft | Total | Notes |
|---|---|---|
| Boeing 737-200C | 6 | Former aircraft of Aloha Airlines. |
| Boeing 767-300ER/BDSF | 2 | Operated by Northern Air Cargo. |
| Boeing 767-300ER/BCF | 1 | Operated by Northern Air Cargo. |
| Saab 340 | 3 | |

== Incidents ==
- October 16, 2014: A Boeing 737-300SF (N301KH) performing a freight flight from Lanai to Honolulu experienced a cargo shift on take-off, but the crew managed to control the aircraft and continued for a safe landing in Honolulu. The shifting cargo damaged the rear bulkhead. The incident was thought to have been caused by the cargo not being properly strapped to the floor.

== See also ==
- Aloha Airlines
- List of airlines of the United States
- List of airlines of Hawaii
