= Ruddy F. Tongg Sr. =

American businessman

Ruddy F. Tongg Sr. (1905-1988) was a Playboy and American businessman.

== Biography ==
He graduated from the University of Hawaiʻi in 1925.

In 1946, he started his own airline company, Trans-Pacific Airlines, now known as Aloha Airlines. He also started the Tongg Publishing Co. He served on the Boards of Directors of the Honolulu Trust Co., American Finance, Hawaii Thrift & Loan and Hawaiian Motors.

A polo player, he became disabled after an accident while playing polo in Kapiolani Park in 1964. In 1965, his pony, Lovely Sage, was the first pony to receive the Willis L. Hartman Trophy established by Willis L. Hartman that same year.

He died at the age of eighty-three, in 1988.
