= Aloha Airlines =

Hawaiian passenger airline (1946–2008)

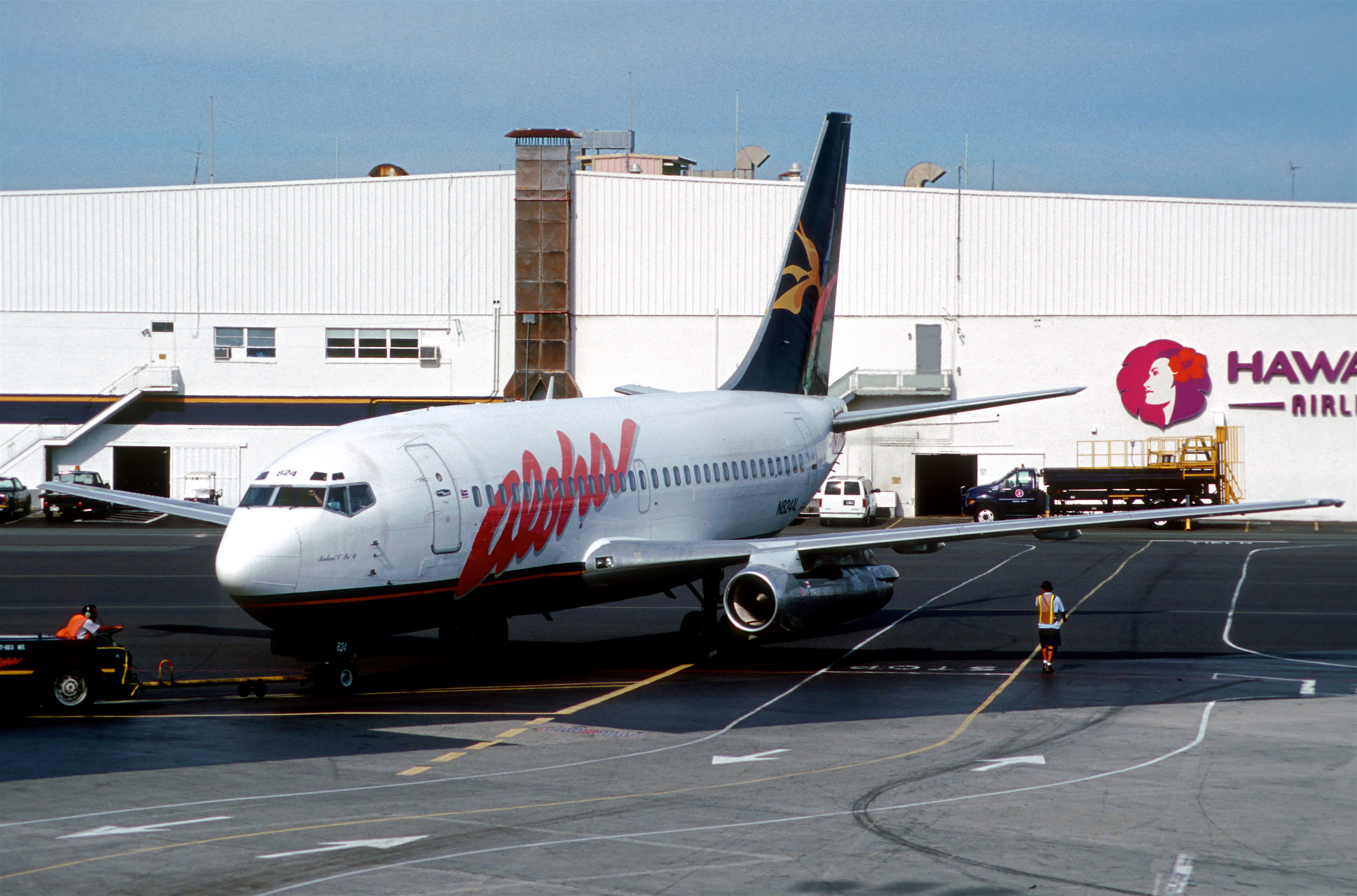
- Aloha Airlines Kalani‘O Ju‘U Boeing 737-200
IATA	ICAO	Call sign
AQ	AAH	ALOHA
- Founded: July 26, 1946 (as Trans-Pacific Airlines)
- Commenced operations: July 26, 1946
- Ceased operations: March 31, 2008 (passenger division closed, cargo division later became Aloha Air Cargo)
- Hubs: Daniel K. Inouye International Airport
- Focus cities: Kahului Airport
- Frequent-flyer program: AlohaPass
- Alliance: Island Air; United Airlines
- Subsidiaries: Aloha Air Cargo; Aloha Pacific Air; Aloha Contract Services; Island Air
- Fleet size: 22
- Destinations: 20
- Parent company: Aloha Air Group
- Headquarters: Honolulu, Hawaii
- Key people: David Banmiller (President & CEO)
- Founders: Ruddy F. Tongg Sr.; Richard C Tongg
- Website: alohaairlines.com

Aloha Airlines was a United States airline that operated passenger flights from 1946 until 2008. It was headquartered in Honolulu, Hawaii, operating from its hub at Honolulu International Airport (now Daniel K. Inouye International Airport). Its IATA code has since been reassigned to 9 Air.

== History ==
=== Propeller era ===
The airline was founded as charter carrier Trans-Pacific Airlines by publisher Ruddy F. Tongg Sr. as a competitor to Hawaiian Airlines, commencing operations on July 26, 1946, with a war-surplus Douglas C-47 (DC-3) on a flight from Honolulu to Maui and Hilo. Tongg and partners founded the airline after being bumped from flights on the only inter-island carrier, Hawaiian Airlines. The company employed local Island residents and its first slogan was "The People's Airline. It soon earned the nickname "The Aloha Airline". Approval to operate as a scheduled airline came when President Harry S. Truman signed the certificate on February 21, 1949, with the first scheduled flight on June 6, 1949, following ceremonies held the previous day.

In 1952, the airline reported its first annual profit, approximately $36,000. In 1950, the airline adopted the name TPA-The Aloha Airline. To compete, Hawaiian Airlines began using the Convair 340. In 1958, real estate developer Hung Wo Ching became CEO of the airline and changed the name to Aloha Airlines. In 1959, Aloha began using Fairchild F-27 turboprops. Also in 1959, the company became a public company via an initial public offering.

=== Jet engine era ===
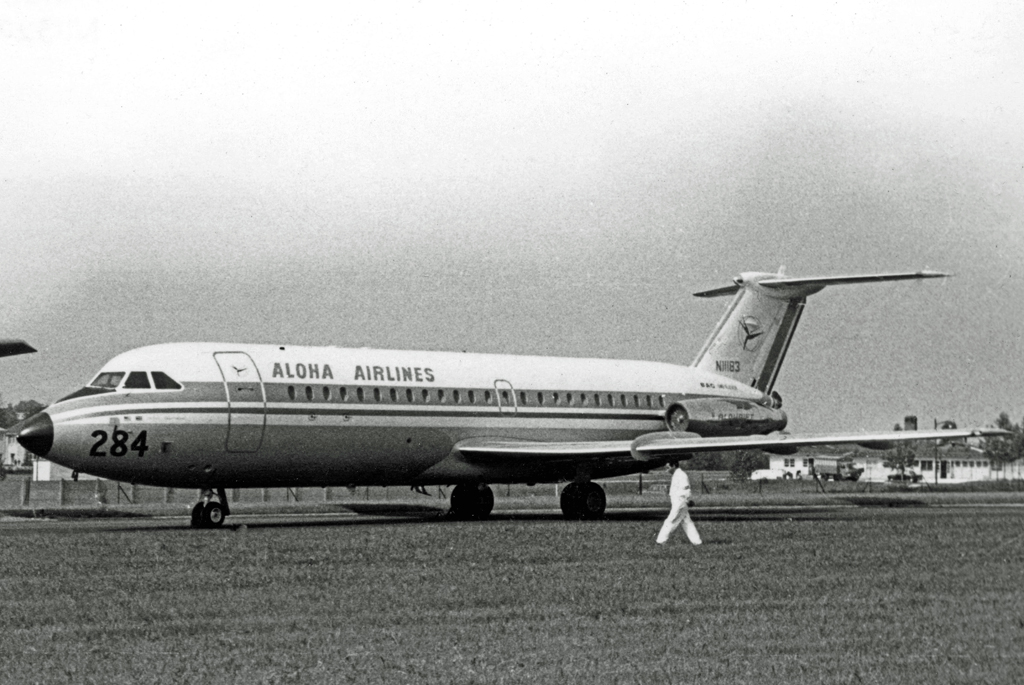
Aloha BAC 1-11 in 1967

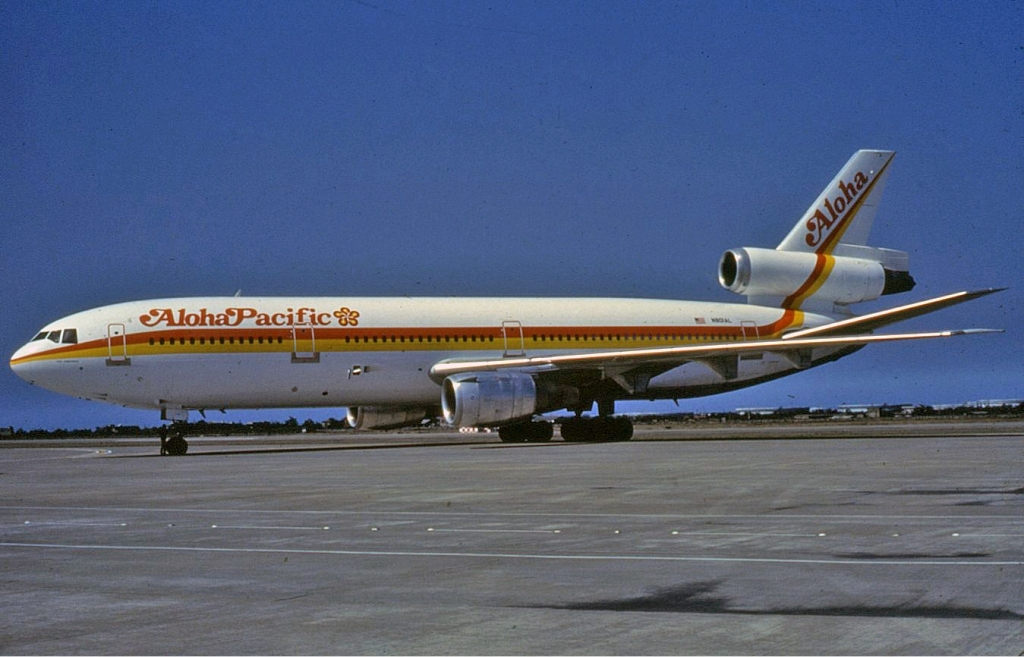
Aloha Pacific DC-10-30 at Taipei Airport in July 1984

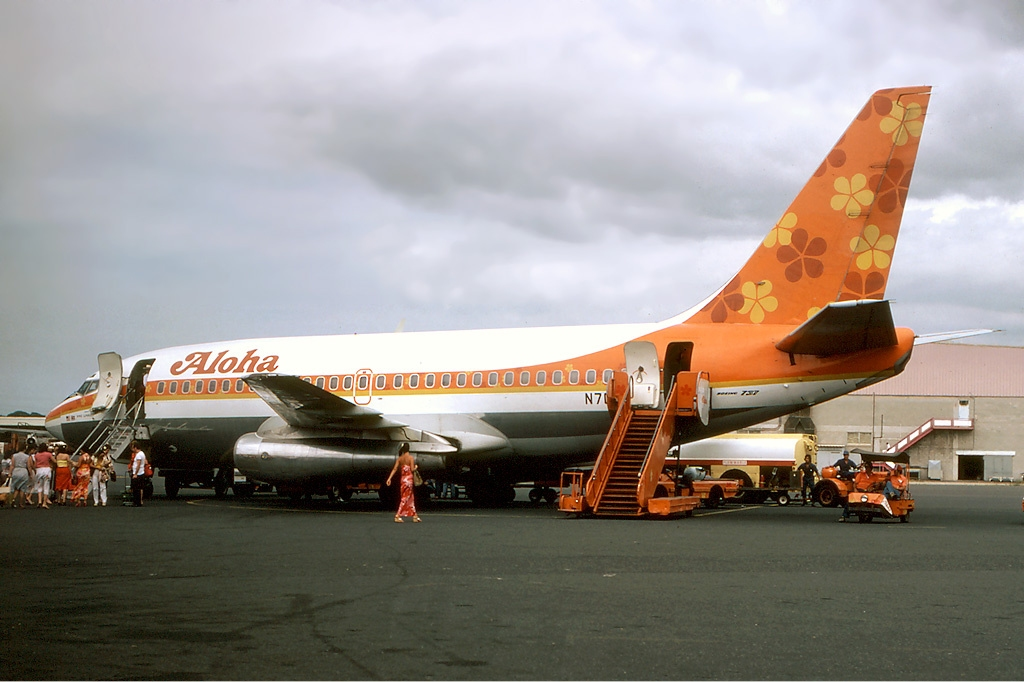
Aloha Boeing 737-200 at Honolulu in May 1981

Aloha retired its last DC-3 on January 3, 1961, becoming the second airline in the United States to operate an all-turbine fleet. In 1963, the airline took delivery of two Vickers Viscounts from Austrian Airlines and soon acquired a third from Northeast Airlines. The October 1, 1964, cover of the airline's system timetable proclaimed "Hawaii's Only All Jet Power Service Between The Islands" as Aloha was operating all of its inter-island flights at this time with the Fairchild F-27 and Vickers Viscount turboprops. Soon, the airline made the move to pure jets, with its first new British Aircraft Corporation BAC One-Eleven twin jet arriving in Honolulu on April 16, 1966. The last F-27 was retired from service in June 1967. As Hawaiian Airlines took delivery of larger Douglas DC-9-30 jets, Aloha realized its smaller BAC One-Eleven series 200 aircraft, which also suffered from performance penalties at Kona International Airport (which had a shorter runway at the time), put it at a disadvantage. Aloha placed an order for two Boeing 737-200 jetliners in 1968. Named "Funbirds", the Boeing jets entered service in March 1969. The massive capacity increase hurt both airlines, and in 1970, the first of three unsuccessful merger attempts between the two rivals (the others coming in 1988 and 2001) was made. In October 1971, the airline sold its remaining Viscount 745 turboprop aircraft and became an all-jet airline.

In 1983, Aloha introduced its AlohaPass frequent flyer program. In 1984, the airline leased a McDonnell Douglas DC-10-30, and on May 28, inaugurated service with the aircraft between Honolulu, Guam, and Taipei under the name Aloha Pacific. The operation, however, was unable to compete with Continental Airlines, and was discontinued on January 12, 1985. In October 1985, Aloha acquired Quick-Change 737 aircraft that could be quickly converted from a passenger configuration to all-cargo freighter for nighttime cargo flights. In February 1986, Aloha began weekly flights between Honolulu and Kiritimati (Christmas Island), becoming the first airline to operate ETOPS approved Boeing 737-200s.

In late 1986, Ching and vice-chairman Sheridan Ing announced plans to take the company private after surviving hostile takeover bids, and it remained in the hands of the Ing and Ching families until its emergence from bankruptcy in 2006, when additional investors including Yucaipa Companies, Aloha Aviation Investment Group, and Aloha Hawaii Investors LLC took stakes in the airline. In 1987, the airline acquired Princeville Airways, renaming it Aloha IslandAir, which became known as Island Air in 1995. In 2003, Island Air was sold to Gavarnie Holding and became an independent airline.

On February 14, 2000, the airline began mainland service, flying newly delivered ETOPS certified Boeing 737-700 jetliners from Honolulu, Kahului, and Kona, Hawaii, to Oakland. The carrier soon started regularly scheduled flights to and from Orange County, San Diego, Sacramento, Reno, and Las Vegas. Aloha also offered flights from Honolulu to Vancouver. In addition, the airline served the Burbank-Glendale-Pasadena Airport (BUR, now known as Bob Hope Airport) in the Los Angeles area with nonstop Boeing 737-700 service to and from Honolulu.

Aloha Airline's longest inter-island route was 216 miles (348 km), while the shortest route was a mere 62 miles (100 km). The average travel distance per inter-island flight was 133 miles (214 km). From late-1989 through mid-2006, Aloha marketed some inter-island routes served by partner Island Air, and passengers earned miles in either its own frequent flyer program, AlohaPass, or in United Airlines' Mileage Plus program.

=== Economic challenges ===
Rising costs and economic stagnation in Japan put Aloha into a defensive position in the early 2000s, exacerbated by the September 11 attacks, the SARS panic of 2003, and soaring fuel prices. On December 30, 2004, Aloha Airlines filed for Chapter 11 bankruptcy protection. Led by Marc Bilbao and six other Giuliani advisors in December 2004, Giuliani Partners through Giuliani Capital sold Aloha to Ronald Burkle's group of investors and also obtained a $65 million loan for the carrier. In November 2005, Giuliani renegotiated with Aloha Chief David Banmiller for Giuliani's total compensation to be increased to $2.9 million. Following approval of new labor contracts and securing additional investment from new investors, the airline emerged from bankruptcy protection on February 17, 2006. On August 30, 2006, Gordon Bethune was named chairman.

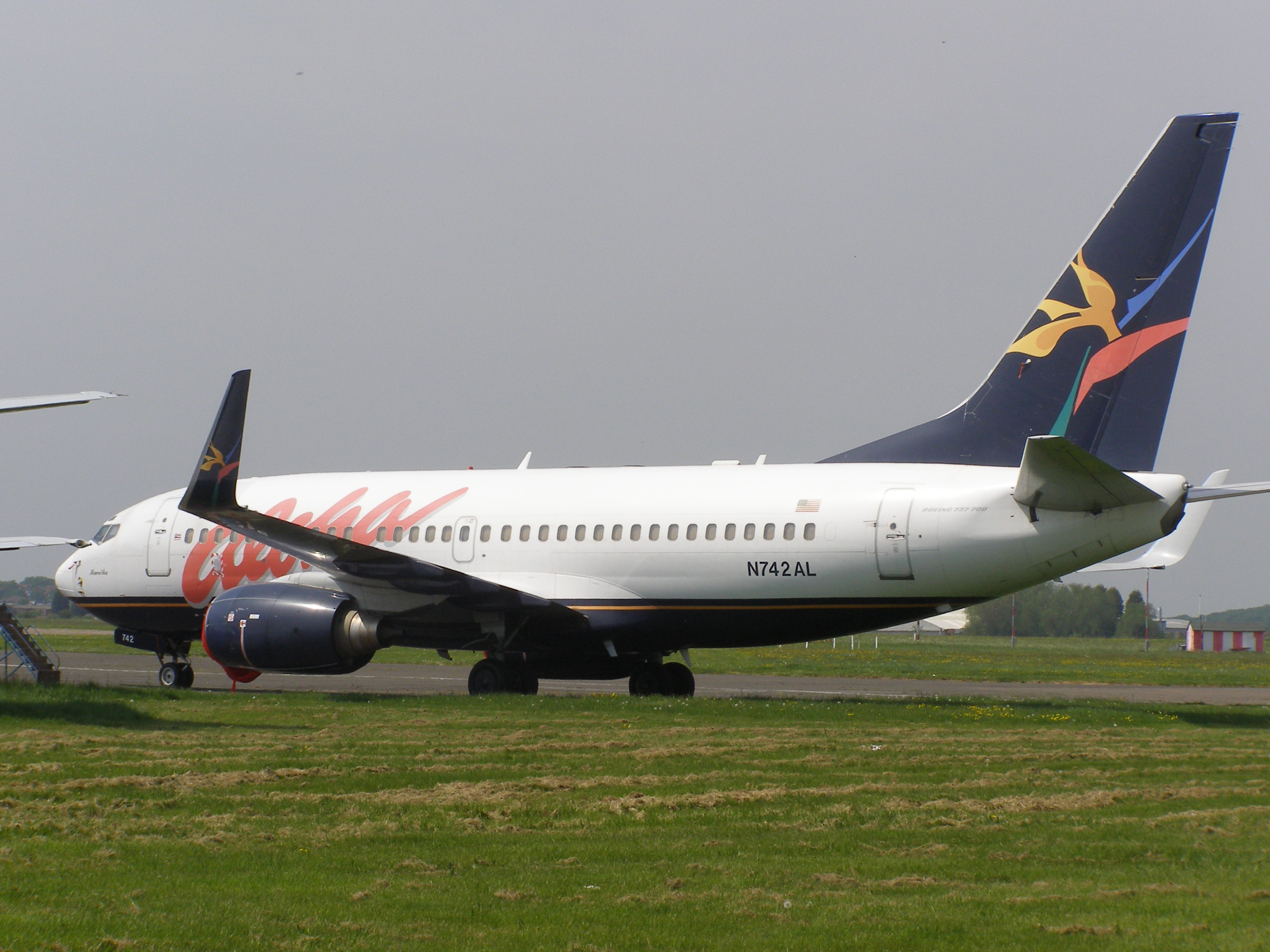
A former Aloha Boeing 737-700WL in storage in Southend Airport, England, after the airline's 2008 demise

Citing losses from a protracted fare war incited by inter-island competitor go! (operated by parent company Mesa Airlines) and high fuel prices, Aloha filed for Chapter 11 bankruptcy protection again on March 20, 2008. Ten days later, on March 30, 2008, Aloha Airlines announced the suspension of all scheduled passenger flights, with the final day of operation to be March 31, 2008. The shutdown resulted in the layoffs of about 1,900 of the company's roughly 3,500 employees. Governor of Hawaii Linda Lingle asked the bankruptcy court involved to delay the shutdown of Aloha Airlines passenger services, and forcibly restore passenger service; however, federal Bankruptcy Judge Lloyd King declined, saying the court should not interfere with business decisions.

After the shutdown of passenger operations, Aloha and its creditors represented by Fieldstone Aviation LLC sought to auction its profitable cargo and contract services division. Fieldstone arranged for Pacific Air Cargo to acquire the contract services ground handling division in 2008 for $2.2 million and it now operates it under the name Aloha Contract Services.

Fieldstone Aviation LLC represented Aloha in the sale of the Aloha cargo division and solicited interest from potential buyers. Several companies expressed interest in purchasing Aloha's cargo division, including Seattle-based Saltchuk Resources, California-based Castle & Cooke Aviation, and Hawaii-based Kahala Capital (which included Richard Ing, a minority investor in the Aloha Air Group and member of Aloha's board of directors). However, a disagreement between cargo division bidders and Aloha's primary lender, GMAC Commercial Finance, ended with the bidders dropping out of the auction. Almost immediately afterwards, GMAC halted all funding to Aloha's cargo division, forcing all cargo operations to cease; at the same time, Aloha's board of directors decided to convert its Chapter 11 bankruptcy reorganization filing into a Chapter 7 bankruptcy liquidation.

Saltchuk decided to renew its bid to purchase the cargo division at the urging of U.S. Senator Daniel Inouye, and a deal between Aloha and Saltchuk was struck and approved by the federal bankruptcy court, where Saltchuk would purchase the cargo division for $10.5 million. The sale arranged by Fieldstone Aviation LLC was approved by federal Bankruptcy Judge Lloyd King on May 12, 2008, with the sale expected to close two days later.

Prior to its bid for Aloha, Saltchuk Resources was already present in Hawaii through its subsidiaries Young Brothers/Hawaiian Tug & Barge, Hawaii Fuel Network, Maui Petroleum and Minit Stop Stores. The company also owns Northern Air Cargo, Alaska's largest cargo airline. A new subsidiary, Aeko Kula Inc., was set up by Saltchuk to operate Aloha Air Cargo.

=== Name and intellectual property ===
In January 2011, Los Angeles-based Yucaipa Companies, the former majority shareholder of Aloha, won federal Bankruptcy Court approval to buy the Aloha name and other intellectual property for $1.5 million with a stipulation that it not resell the name to Mesa Air Group, the parent of go! Mokulele. In 2009, Mesa sought to re-brand its go! planes as Aloha. But federal Bankruptcy Judge Lloyd King stopped the name change, following impassioned pleas from former Aloha Airlines employees who largely blamed Mesa for Aloha's demise.

== Destinations ==
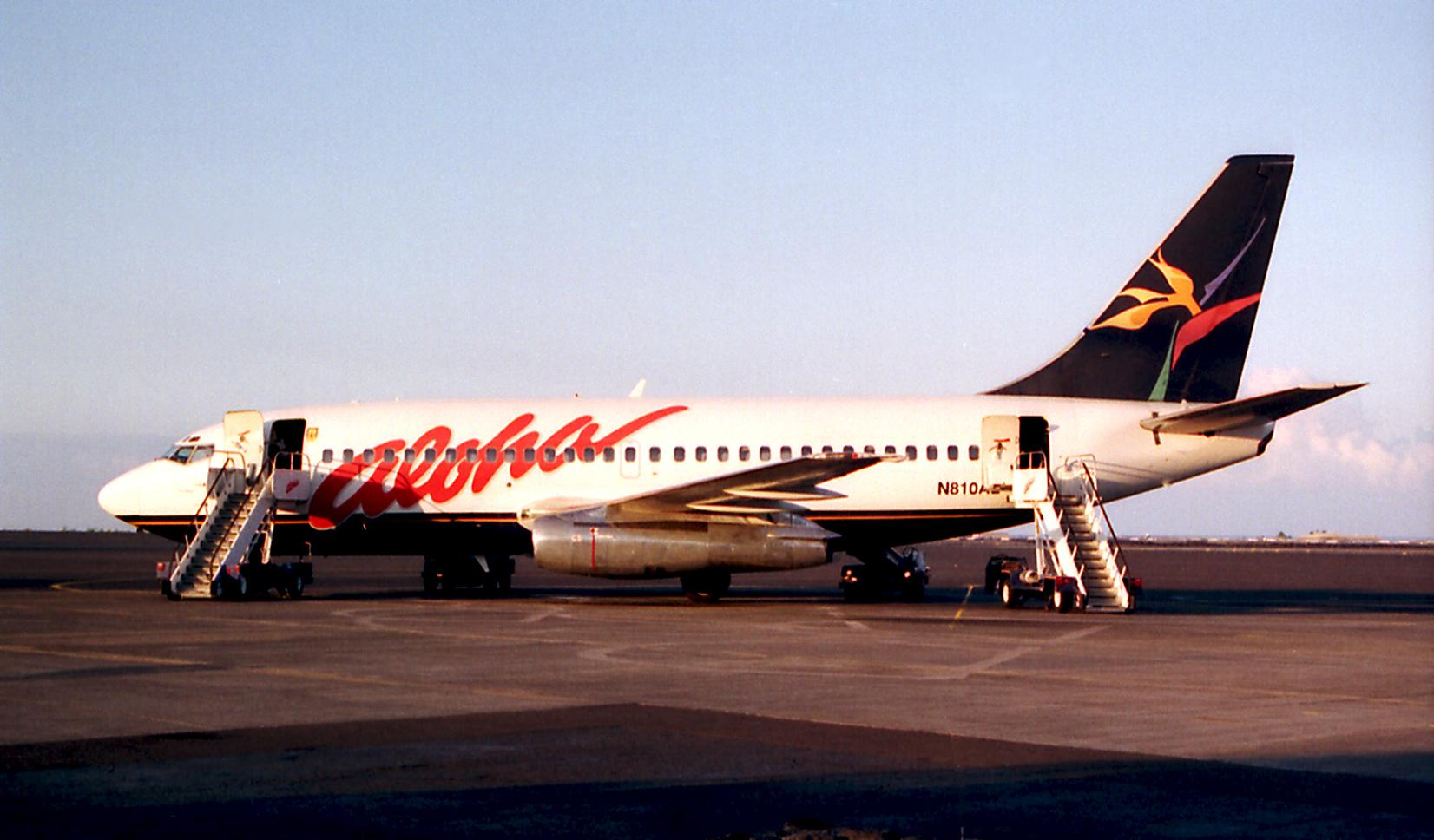
Boeing 737-200

Prior to the shutdown of its passenger services on March 31, 2008, Aloha Airlines provided passenger service to/from the following destinations:

American Samoa

- Pago Pago (Pago Pago International Airport) twice weekly flight

Canada

- Vancouver (Vancouver International Airport)

Cook Islands

- Rarotonga (Rarotonga International Airport)

Kiribati

- Kiritimati (Cassidy International Airport) one weekly flight, usually on Sunday mornings to connect Hawaii with Christmas Island

Marshall Islands

- Kwajalein (Bucholz Army Airfield) twice weekly flight, alternate stop via Majuro
- Majuro (Marshall Islands International Airport) twice weekly flight, alternate stop via Kwajalein

Midway Atoll

- Midway (Henderson Field) scheduled chartered flights, usually on Wednesdays

United States

- Burbank (Bob Hope Airport)
- Hilo (Hilo International Airport)
- Honolulu (Honolulu International Airport) Hub
- Kahului (Kahului Airport) Focus City
- Kailua (Kona International Airport)
- Las Vegas (McCarran International Airport)
- Lihue (Lihue Airport)
- Oakland (Oakland International Airport)
- Orange County (John Wayne Airport)
- Phoenix (Sky Harbor International Airport)
- Reno (Reno/Tahoe International Airport)
- Sacramento (Sacramento International Airport)
- San Diego (San Diego International Airport)

=== Codeshare agreements ===
Aloha Airlines had codeshare agreements with the following airlines:

- Island Air
- United Airlines

== Accidents and incidents ==
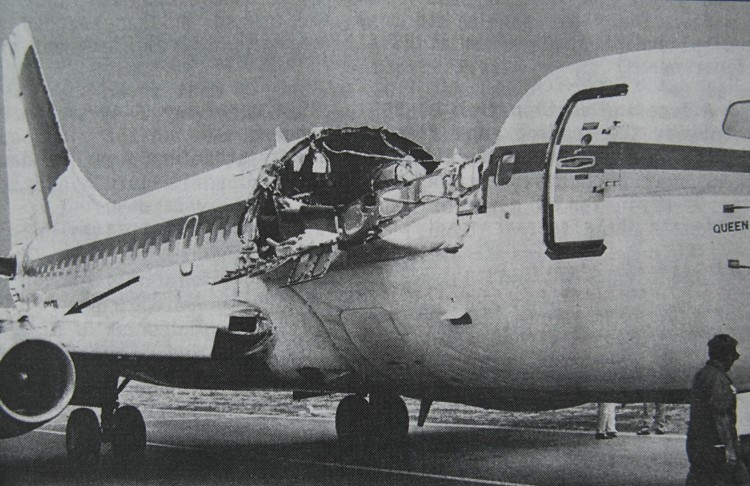
The fuselage of Aloha Airlines Flight 243 after suffering explosive decompression over Hawaii

- On June 27, 1969, Vickers Viscount (N7410) was damaged beyond repair when it collided on the ground with Douglas DC-9-31 N906H of Hawaiian Airlines at Honolulu International Airport.
- On August 8, 1971, Vickers Viscount (N7415) was damaged beyond economic repair at Honolulu International Airport when a fire broke out upon landing.
- On April 28, 1988, Aloha Airlines Flight 243, a scheduled Boeing 737-200 flight between Hilo and Honolulu, suffered extensive damage after an explosive decompression in flight, but was able to land safely at Kahului Airport on Maui. A senior flight attendant, Clarabelle Lansing, was the sole fatality when she was blown out of the airplane, and 64 passengers and one crew member were injured, eight of them seriously. The safe landing of the aircraft with such a major loss of integrity was unprecedented. Subsequent investigations concluded that the accident was caused by metal fatigue. The 1990 made-for-television film Miracle Landing is based on this accident.

== See also ==
- List of defunct airlines of the United States

== Bibliography ==
- Wood, B. (1996). 50 years of Aloha-The story of Aloha Airlines. Honolulu (HI): Aloha Airlines Inc.
- Forman, Peter (2005). Wings of paradise-Hawaii's incomparable airlines. Kailua (HI): Barnstormer Books. ISBN 978-0-9701594-4-1.
