= Willis L. Hartman =

American polo player

Willis L. Hartman was an American polo player.

== Biography ==
Willis L. Hartman lived in Wichita, Kansas, where he played polo on the Wilson Estates.

In 1965, he established the Willis L. Hartman Trophy to recognize the winner of the Best Playing Pony of the U.S. Open Polo Championship. The trophy is a silver polo pony manufactured by the London-based jewellers Garrard & Co. The first trophy was given to Lovely Sage, a pony owned by the Hawaiian businessman Ruddy F. Tongg, Sr.

He helped establish the Tulsa Polo Club in Tulsa, Oklahoma, the Broad Acres Polo Club in Norman, Oklahoma, and the Royal Palm Polo Club in Boca Raton, Florida. He also served on the Board of Governors of the United States Polo Association (USPA).

He was inducted into the Museum of Polo and Hall of Fame in Lake Worth, Florida on March 3, 2000.
