= Northern Air Cargo =

Cargo airline of the United States

Northern Air Cargo, LLC

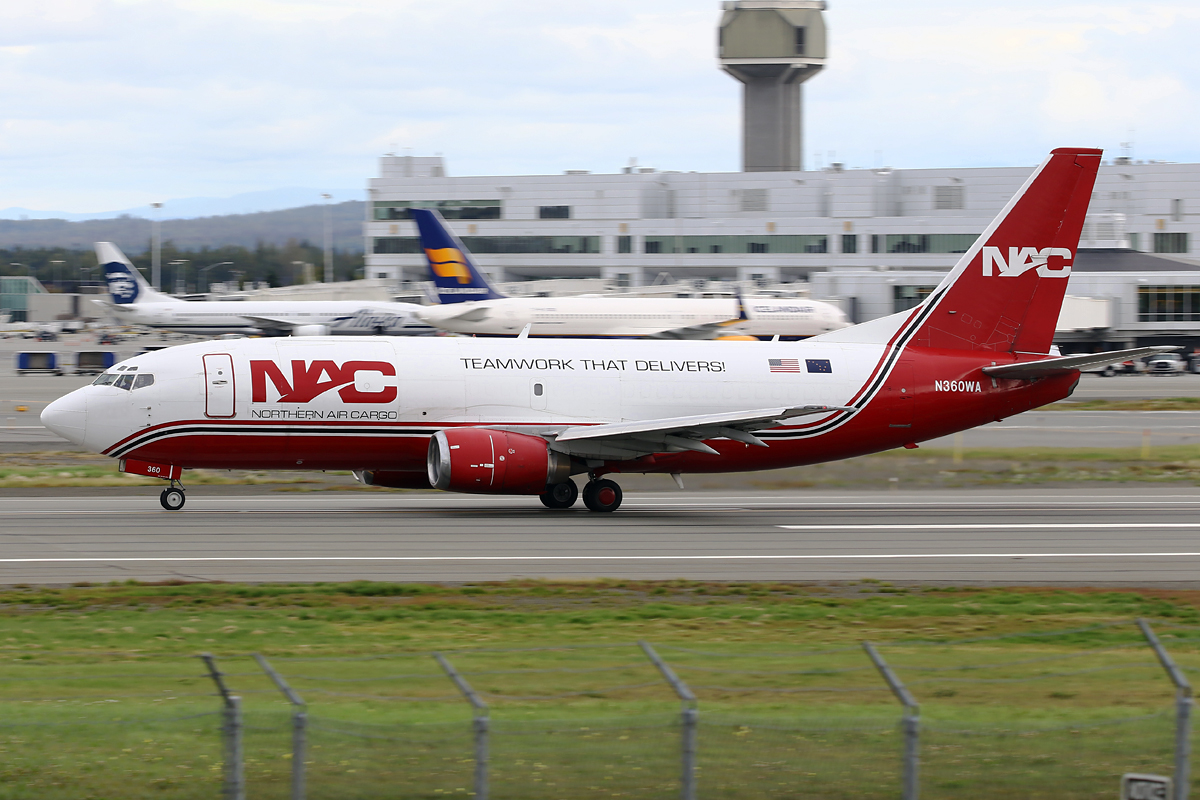
IATA	ICAO	Call sign
NC	NAC	YUKON
- Founded: 1956; 70 years ago
- AOC #: NACA002A
- Hubs: Ted Stevens Anchorage International Airport
- Fleet size: See Fleet
- Destinations: See Destinations
- Parent company: Northern Aviation Services; Saltchuk Resources, Inc.
- Headquarters: Anchorage, Alaska
- Key people: David Karp (President & CEO)
- Website: nac.aero

Northern Air Cargo (NAC) is an American cargo airline based in Anchorage, Alaska, United States. NAC operates a small fleet of Boeing 737 freighter aircraft within the state of Alaska and formerly widebody Boeing 767 freighter services throughout the Caribbean and South America. Other services include aircraft maintenance services through its subsidiary, Northern Air Maintenance Services, on-demand charters, and consolidation of cargo. With a main base at the Ted Stevens Anchorage International Airport, NAC is a division of Saltchuk, which is the corporate parent of a number of transportation and distribution companies, including Aloha Air Cargo, a cargo airline based in Hawaii.

== History ==
Northern Air Cargo was established in 1956 as a charter freight service by Robert "Bobby" Sholton and Maurice Carlson, and began operations with two Fairchild C-82 Packets.

The airline has the distinction of being one of the very few organizations to operate a C-133 Cargomaster in civilian service, which it did during the late 1970s and early 1980s. See Fleet.

In 2019, NAC retired its last Boeing 737-200 freighter with the replacements being later model and improved Boeing 737-300s and 400s.

In July 2025, Northern Air Cargo announced it would withdraw from long-haul flights using the Boeing 767, as well as its Latin American routes from Miami International Airport. This was done to focus more on their domestic operations.

== Destinations ==
As of October 2025, Northern Air Cargo operates scheduled and charter freight services to the following domestic destinations:

Alaska

- Anchorage (PANC / ANC)
- Aniak (PANI / ANI)
- Barrow / Utqiagvik (PABR / BRW)
- Bethel (PABE / BET)
- Deadhorse (PASC / SCC)
- Dillingham (PADL / DLG)
- Fairbanks (PAFA / FAI)
- King Salmon (PAKN / AKN)
- Kotzebue (PAOT / OTZ)
- Nome (PAOM / OME)
- Unalakleet (PAUN / UNK)

Washington

- Seattle (KSEA / SEA)

== Fleet ==
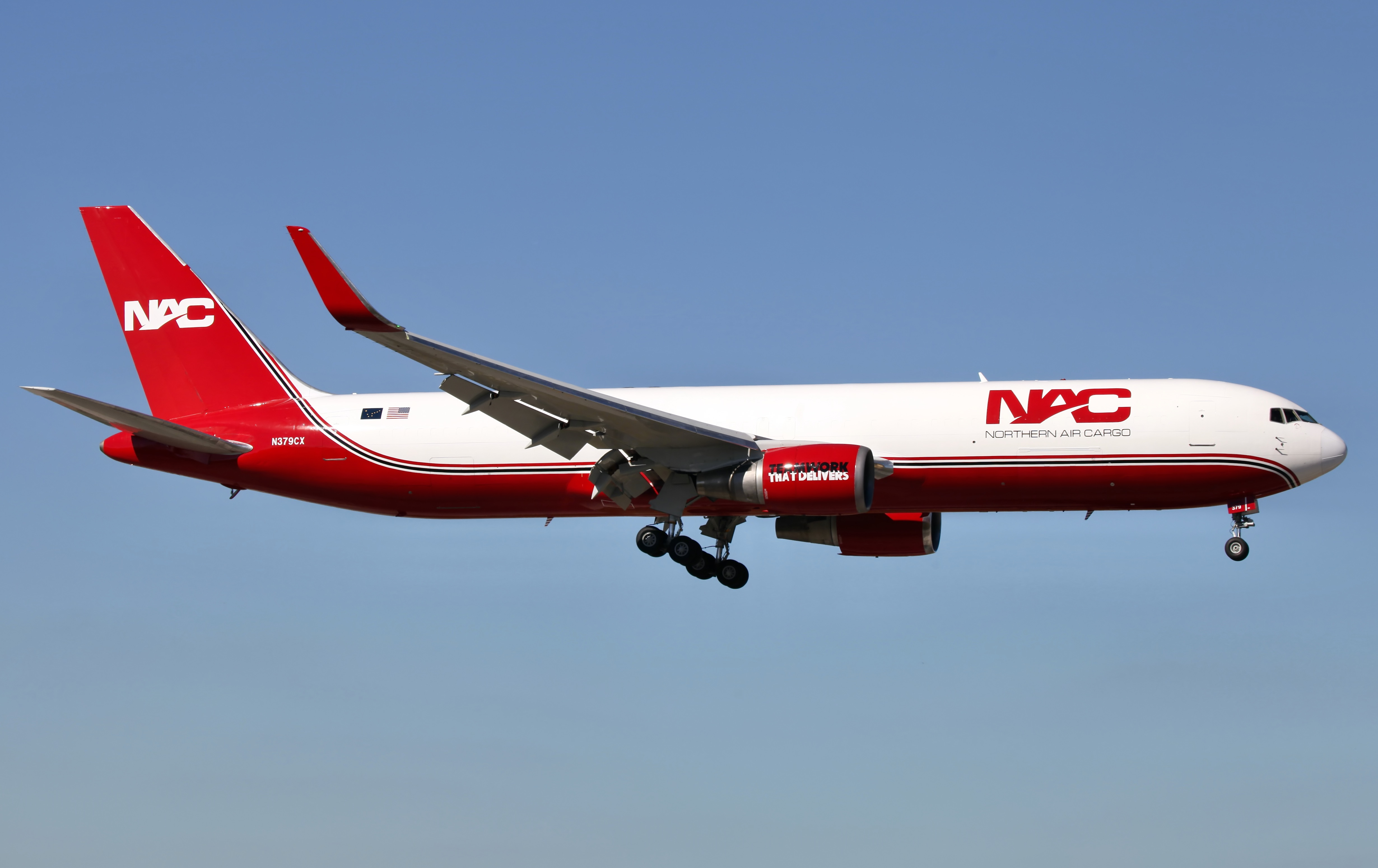
Boeing 767-300

=== Currently operating ===
As of September 2025, Northern Air Cargo operates the following aircraft:

Northern Air Cargo fleet
Aircraft	Total	Orders	Notes
Boeing 737-300(SF)	1	—	
Boeing 737-400(SF)	3	—	
Boeing 737-800(SF)	1	—	
Total	5		

=== Previously operated ===
Northern Air Cargo has previously operated the following aircraft:

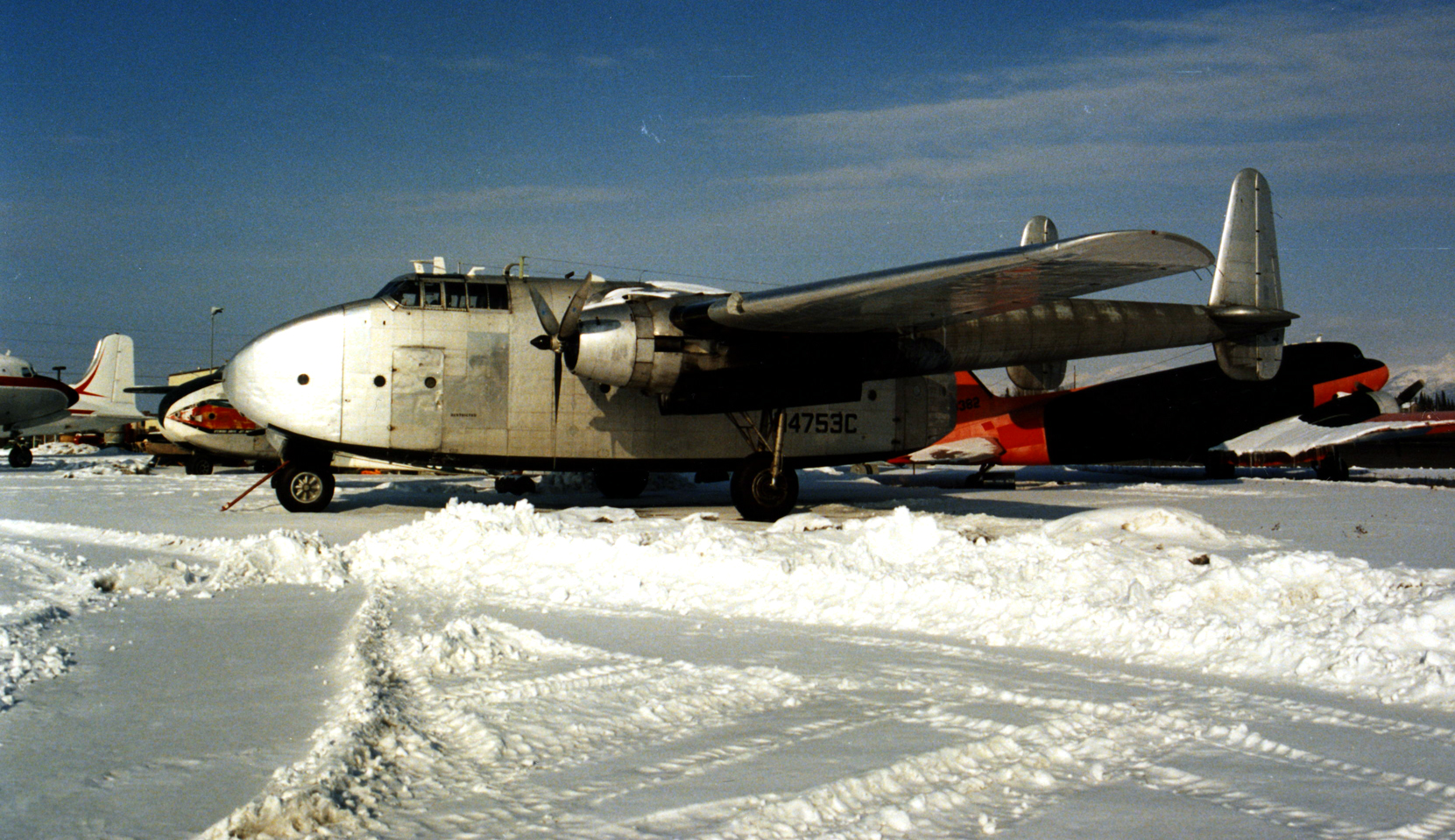
A Fairchild C-82A "Packet" of NAC, April 1985.

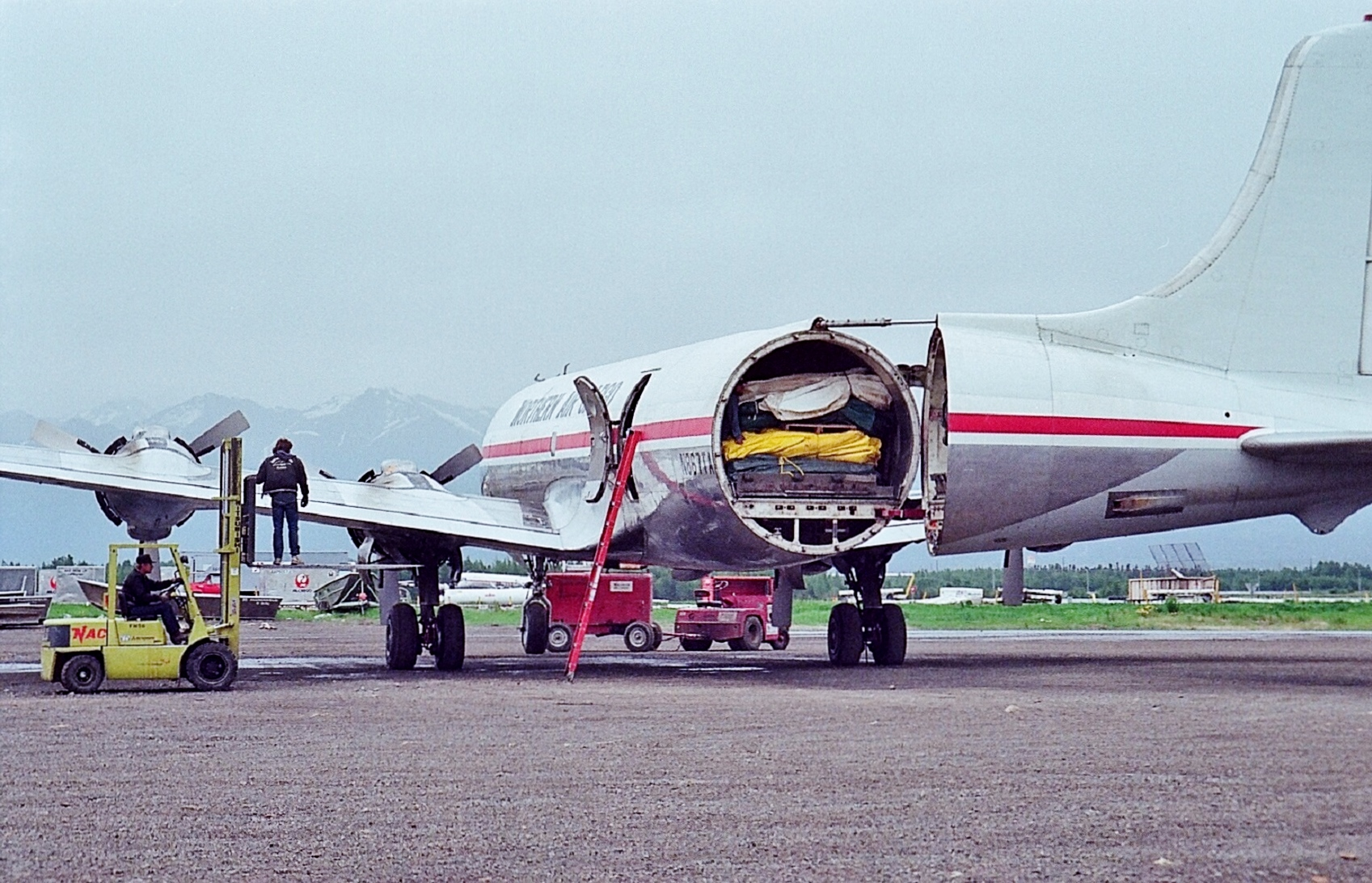
NAC operated two Douglas DC-6s which had been converted to swing-tail configuration

Aircraft	Total	Notes
ATR 42-300	1	
Boeing 727-100C	1	
Boeing 727-100F	3	
Boeing 737-200	3	Retired in February 2019.
Boeing 767-300ER/BDSF	4	
Boeing 767-300ER/BCF	5	
Douglas DC-6	13	Two crashed (N867TA) and (N313RS)
Fairchild C-82	2	

In 1979, it operated the following aircraft:

- 1 Douglas C-133B Cargomaster
- 2 Douglas DC-3
- 2 Fairchild C-82A
- 4 Douglas DC-6A/B

In 1987, it operated the following aircraft:

- 2 Fairchild C-82A
- 11 Douglas DC-6A/B

== Services ==
Northern Air Cargo currently offers the following services within its Alaska route structure:

- General Air Cargo: The basic level of retail cargo service. Except for certain oversized and special items, delivery is within 7 days.
- Express Air Cargo: A higher rate guaranteeing the placement of the customer's cargo on the second scheduled flight to its destination.
- Priority Air Cargo: The highest level of service, guaranteeing the placement of the customer's cargo on the next scheduled flight to its destination. This level of service is required for live animals.
- NAC PAC: A "flat rate" service for the shipment of envelopes and small items to regularly scheduled destinations. NAC PAC shipments are treated as priority.
- Dangerous Goods

== Accidents and incidents ==
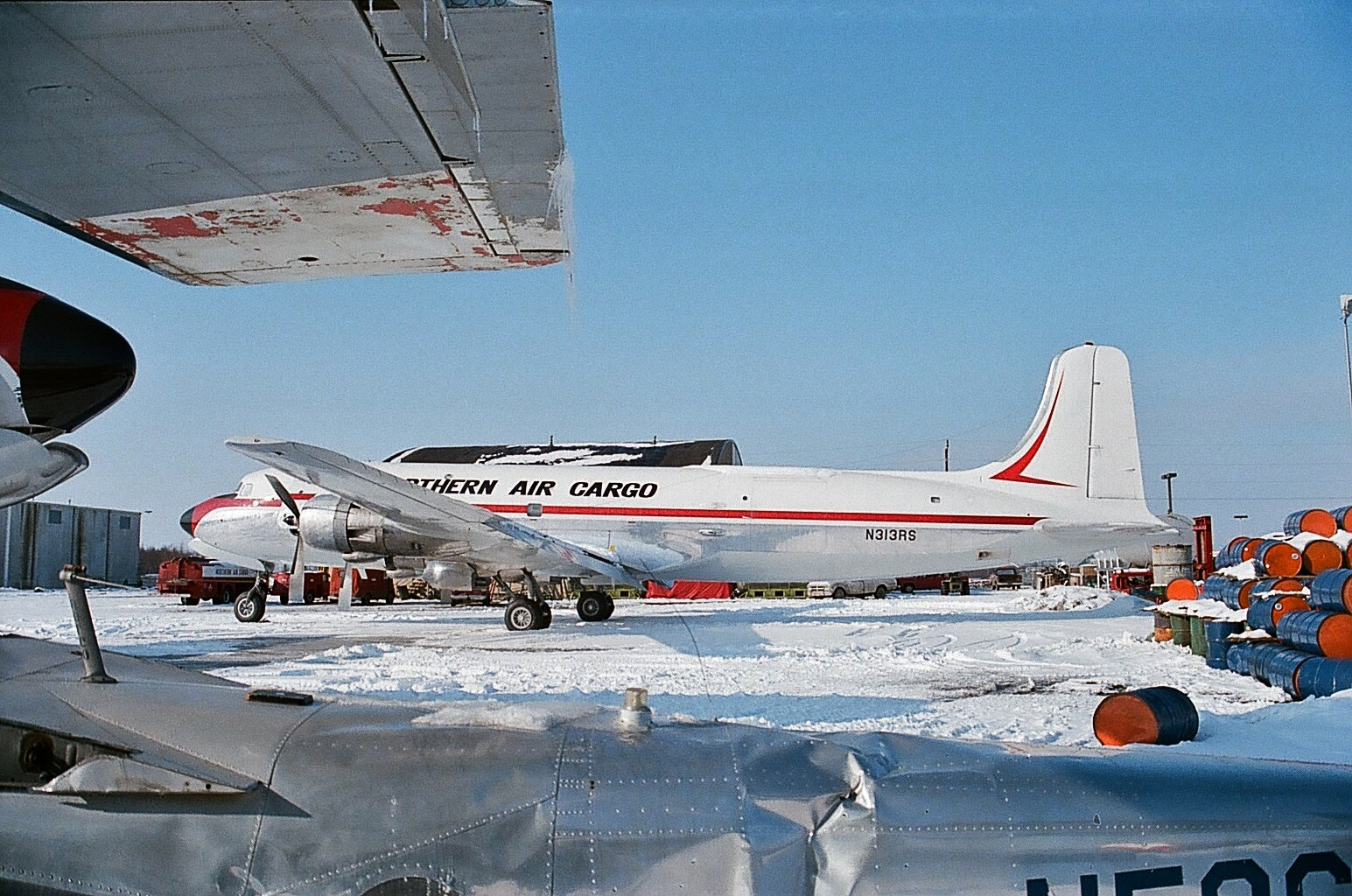
The DC-6 that crashed on July 20, 1996, April 1985

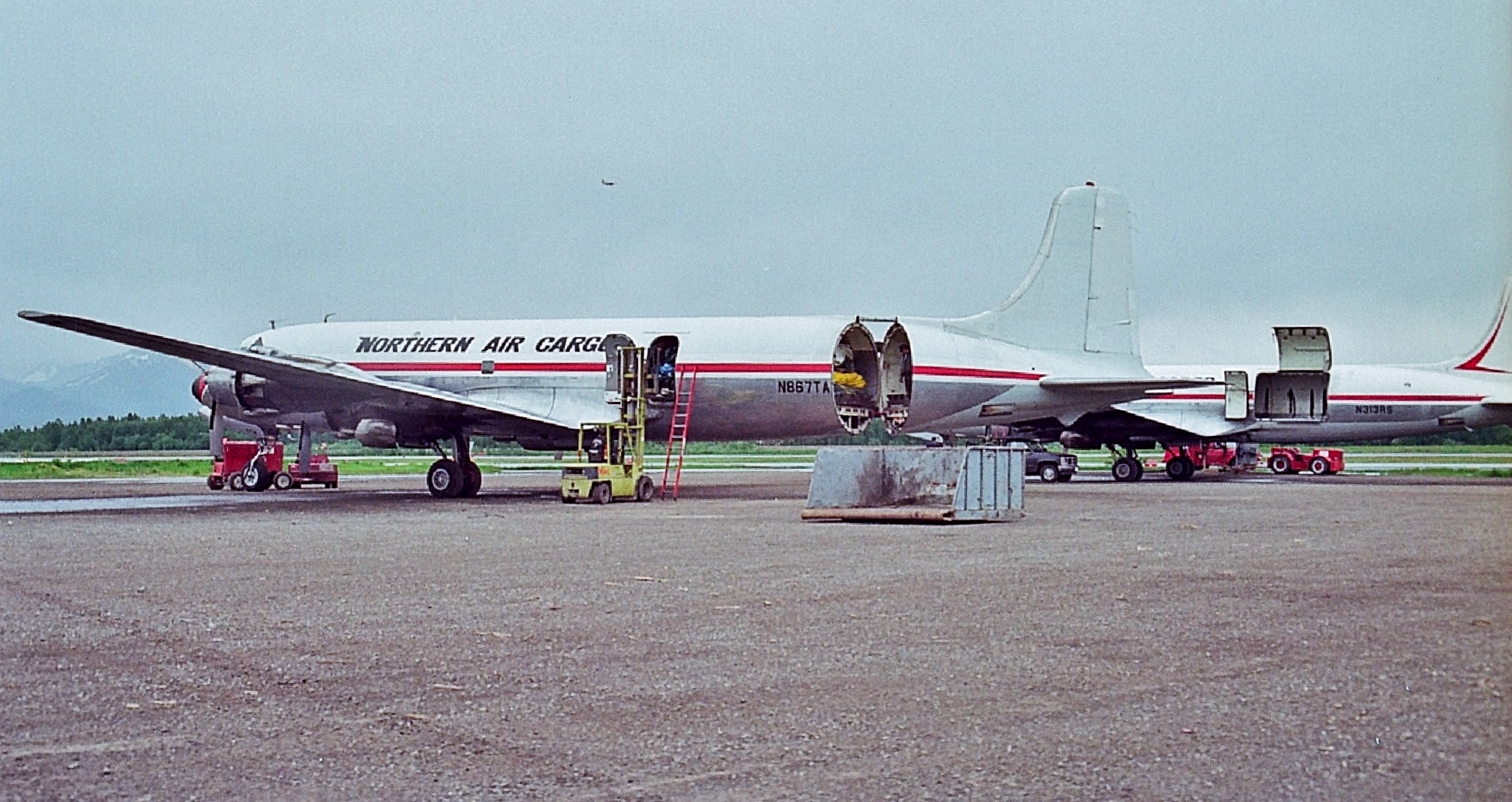
The DC-6 that crashed on 25 September 2001, June 1989

- On July 20, 1996, Northern Air Cargo Flight 33, a Douglas DC-6 (registration N313RS) was flying from (Emmonak to Aniak) when it crashed during an attempted an emergency landing at Russian Mission after the #3 engine catching fire. When the aircraft turned towards its final approach, its right wing was seen folded up. The plane rolled to the right, pitched nose down, and flew into the ground. All 4 on board were killed, including a jump seat passenger, who was a bush pilot employed by Grant Aviation. The cause of the crash was determined to be the fatigue on the engine and improper procedures (failure to feather #3 Prop) during an emergency by the pilots on board.
- On September 25, 2001, the left wing broke off of a Northern Air Cargo Douglas DC-6BF, registration N867TA, while landing on Alpine Airstrip, AK, on a cargo flight from Deadhorse Airport. The aircraft subsequently veered off the left side of the runway and was destroyed in a post-crash fire. All 3 crew members on board survived. The aircraft was written off.
- On February 14, 2002, Northern Air Cargo Flight 20, a Boeing 727 (registration N190AJ), struck its right wingtip while landing on runway 8 (today's runway 9) at Ralph Wien Memorial Airport in Kotzebue, Alaska following a visual approach. None of the four occupants were injured, and the crew was unaware of the wingtip strike until the flight engineer noticed the damage while conducting his preflight inspection prior to departure. The aircraft was repaired and returned to service.

== See also ==
- List of airlines of the United States
