= Hilo International Airport =

Airport in Hilo, Hawaii, United States

Hilo International Airport Kahua Mokulele Kauʻāina o Hilo
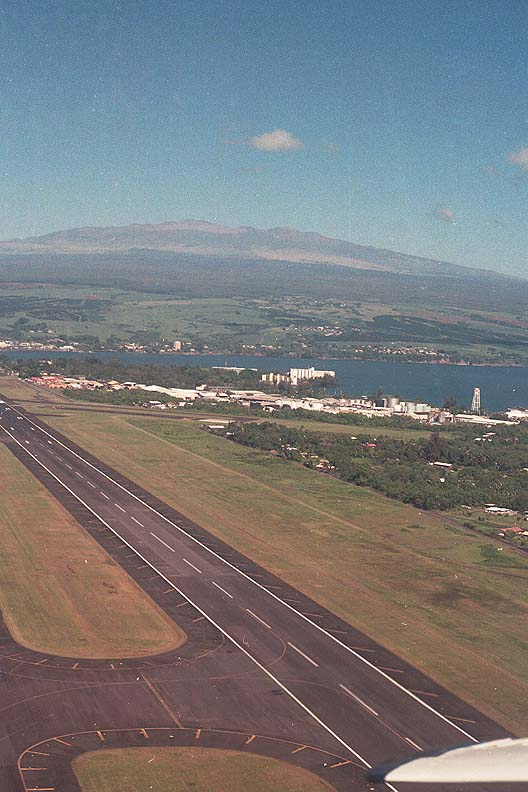
- 1990 view of ITO with Mauna Kea in the background
- IATA: ITO; ICAO: PHTO; FAA LID: ITO; WMO: 91285

Summary
- Airport type: Public
- Owner/Operator: Hawaii Department of Transportation
- Location: Hilo, Hawaii
- Elevation AMSL: 38 ft (12 m)
- Coordinates: 19°43′13″N 155°02′54″W
- Website: hawaii.gov/ito

Maps
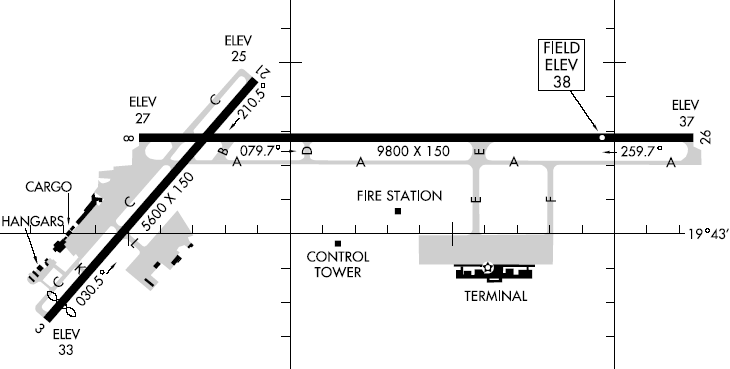
- FAA airport diagram
- Interactive map of Hilo International Airport

Runways
Direction	Length		Surface
Direction	ft	m	Surface
03/21	5,600	1,707	Asphalt
08/26	9,800	2,987	Asphalt

Statistics (2025)
- Passengers: 1,474,487
- Aircraft operations: 36,232
- Source: Hawaiʻi State Department of Transportation, Federal Aviation Administration,

Hilo International Airport (IATA: ITO, ICAO: PHTO, FAA LID: ITO), formerly General Lyman Field, is a regional airport located in Hilo, Hawaii, United States. Owned and operated by the Hawaii Department of Transportation, the airport serves windward (eastern) Hawaiʻi island including the districts of Hilo, Hāmākua and Kaʻū, and Puna. It is one of two international airports serving Hawaiʻi island, the other being Kona International Airport on the leeward (western) side.

Although named an international airport, most flights operate between either Honolulu International Airport on Oahu or Kahului Airport on Maui. The airport encompasses 1,007 acres (408 ha) of land.

It is included in the Federal Aviation Administration (FAA) National Plan of Integrated Airport Systems for 2021–2025, in which it is categorized as a small-hub primary commercial service facility.

== History ==
=== Initial development ===
In 1927 the Territory of Hawaii legislature passed Act 257, authorizing the expenditure of $25,000 for the construction of a landing strip in Hilo. The site was known as Keaukaha, on land belonging to the Hawaiian Homes Commission. Inmates from a nearby prison camp cleared the area of brush and rocks. The new facility was dedicated on February 11, 1928, by Major Clarence M. Young, then Secretary of Aeronautics of the U.S. Department of Commerce.

Sixteen months after the dedication, scheduled inter-island service began on November 11, 1929, by Inter-Island Airways, the forerunner of Hawaiian Airlines. For $32, travelers could climb aboard an eight-passenger Sikorsky S-38 on thrice-weekly flights between Hilo and Honolulu. Five years later, in 1934, the company was awarded the right to carry air mail for the U.S. Postal Service.

=== Early expansion ===
Improvements to Hilo's airfield were minimal during its first decade. Between 1927 and 1937, just over $34,000 was spent in developing the site. Over the next five years, however, the Works Progress Administration spent $261,613 to upgrade the airport. An additional $314,000 was provided by the Civil Aeronautics Administration in 1941.

During martial law in the territory following the attack on Pearl Harbor, all airports in the Hawaiian Islands came under the control of the U.S. military. The Army Engineers continued to expand the airport. In addition to military facilities to support an Air Corp fighter squadron at Hilo, the Army expanded and improved runways, taxiways and aprons. On April 19, 1943, the Territorial Legislature renamed Hilo Airport "General Lyman Field", for General Albert Kualiʻi Brickwood Lyman (1885–1942), the first U.S. General of Hawaiian ancestry. He was one of three sons of Rufus Anderson Lyman to attend the United States Military Academy.

The end of the war did not immediately bring about a return to civilian control of General Lyman Field. Although ownership of the airport was returned to the territory in September 1946, the Air Force leased the facilities and retained operational control of its tower for over three years after Japan's surrender. Meanwhile, Trans-Pacific Airlines, later renamed Aloha Airlines, commenced inter-island flights on July 26, 1946. On April 8, 1952, the territory assumed full control, paving the way for another round of expansion.

A groundbreaking ceremony for a new terminal building was held on July 17, 1952. At the same time, new high intensity lights were installed on Runway 8–26. Plans included a new freight terminal, aprons, parking areas and roads. The airport's new passenger terminal was completed and dedicated on December 5, 1953, and its freight terminal in June 1954.

=== Overseas growth ===
During the late 1950s, Territorial leaders anticipated a boom in tourism, prompting plans for a second runway capable of accommodating large jet aircraft. The Hawaiʻi Aeronautics Commission recommended that General Lyman Field be expanded for overseas flights. In April 1958, the territory acquired 91.6 acres (37.1 ha) on the eastern edge of the airport for a longer runway to enable non-stop flights to the west coast of the United States. The first phase was completed by April 1963 and the 9,800 feet (3,000 m) runway was dedicated on March 6, 1965. Interisland jet service from Honolulu and Maui was introduced by Aloha Airlines and Hawaiian Airlines during the mid-1960s. According to their respective system timetables at the time, in 1966 Aloha was serving Hilo with British Aircraft Corporation BAC One-Eleven jets as well as with Fairchild F-27 and Vickers Viscount turboprops while Hawaiian was serving the airport with Douglas DC-9-10 jets and also with Convair 640 turboprops. In April 1967 the state finished new taxiways and aprons, finally allowing the airport to receive overseas flights. On October 1, 1967, United Airlines Douglas DC-8 jets and Pan American World Airways Boeing 707 jets initiated nonstop flights from San Francisco (SFO) and Los Angeles (LAX).

Work began on an interim overseas terminal at General Lyman Field in November 1968. With a price tag of $775,000, this facility was designed for the burgeoning number of overseas passengers until a new terminal complex could be built. It was dedicated on July 4, 1969. The following year, Governor John Burns appointed the Hilo Airport Advisory Committee to make recommendations on long-term development of the airport. They suggested relocating terminals from the western edge of Runway 3–21 to the south of the newly lengthened Runway 8-26. The new terminal was designed for the largest passenger airliner in service: the Boeing 747. The airlines, however, did not wait until the new terminal was built; on February 6, 1971, the first jumbo jet landed: a 747 operated by Braniff International Airways.

Groundbreaking for a new terminal was held in July 1974. Construction of the terminal was done in two phases. The first was completed in 1975 and work immediately commenced on phase two. On April 30, 1976, officials dedicated the new, much more modern facility. In order to better serve the airport and its lengthened runway, the FAA opened a new, taller air traffic control tower on November 2, 1979.

=== Overseas retrenchment ===
The introduction of overseas service to General Lyman Field initially met with success. Joining United Airlines and Pan American World Airways in providing nonstop and direct service to Hilo from the west coast and other locations in the U.S. were Braniff International Airways, Continental Airlines, Northwest Airlines and Western Airlines. In 1968, Northwest was operating Boeing 707-320C jet service nonstop to Hilo from Seattle (SEA) twice a week with this flight also providing direct, no change of plane service from New York JFK Airport (JFK), Philadelphia (PHL), Cleveland (CLE) and Chicago O'Hare Airport (ORD). In 1969, United was operating daily nonstop flights from Los Angeles (LAX) and San Francisco (SFO) with Douglas DC-8 jets including stretched Super DC-8-61 jetliners with direct, no change of plane Super DC-8 service being flown daily to Hilo from Chicago O'Hare Airport (ORD) and Boston (BOS) via LAX while Pan American (Pan Am) was flying daily nonstop Boeing 707 service from Los Angeles (LAX) with 707 flights also being operated three days a week nonstop from San Francisco (SFO) and two days a week nonstop from Seattle (SEA) with this latter flight originating at Portland (PDX). Also in 1969, Braniff was operating Boeing 707-320 jet service with weekly nonstop flights from Dallas Love Field (DAL), Houston Hobby Airport (HOU) and St. Louis (STL) with the airline also operating direct one-stop 707 service once a week to Hilo from Atlanta (ATL), Miami (MIA) and New Orleans (MSY). By 1971, Continental was flying Boeing 707-320C jetliners nonstop from Los Angeles (LAX) with direct, no change of plane 707 service being operated from Denver (DEN), Kansas City (MCI), Portland (PDX) and Seattle (SEA) with flights from PDX and SEA making an intermediate stop in Honolulu.

The number of overseas passengers flying through Hilo peaked at 313,428 in 1971 and remained between 250,000 and 300,000 for most of the decade. According to the Official Airline Guide (OAG), in 1975 Northwest, United and Western were continuing to serve Hilo. At this time, Northwest was flying nonstop Boeing 747 service once a week from Portland (PDX) with this flight originating in Seattle (SEA), United was operating daily Boeing 747 service nonstop from Los Angeles (LAX) as well as nonstop Douglas DC-8 flights from San Francisco (SFO) five days a week while Western was flying Boeing 720B service nonstop from Los Angeles (LAX) twice a week. A year later in 1976, Continental was once again serving Hilo with a daily direct McDonnell Douglas DC-10 flight from Denver (DEN) and Los Angeles (LAX) with this service making an intermediate stop in Honolulu while at this same time United was operating a Douglas DC-8 flight four days a week with a westbound routing of New York Newark Airport (EWR) – Cleveland (CLE) – San Francisco (SFO) – Hilo (ITO) in addition to operating daily nonstop Boeing 747 service from Los Angeles (LAX).

Beginning in 1979, however, overseas passenger traffic began to fall steadily, leading one carrier after another to suspend service to Hilo. The OAG lists only two air carriers operating nonstop service from the U.S. mainland to Hilo in 1979: United operating daily McDonnell Douglas DC-10 flights with one nonstop flight a day from both Los Angeles (LAX) and San Francisco (SFO), and Western operating nonstop DC-10 service once a week from LAX. In early 1985, United was operating just one departure a day from Hilo: a daily nonstop to Los Angeles (LAX) flown with a stretched Super DC-8. Also by the mid-1980s, overseas traffic had fallen by such an extent that United Airlines, the sole remaining overseas carrier, terminated scheduled service on December 1, 1986. The number of overseas passengers traveling to Hilo had declined in each of the previous eight years. During the first eleven months of 1986, United Airlines had served a mere 20,914 passengers in Hilo. Hilo would be left without nonstop service to North America for nearly two decades.

At the same time, the state's other major airports added overseas service. United Airlines commenced service to Kahului Airport on January 5, 1983, followed by service to Kona International Airport on September 7 and finally to Līhuʻe Airport in August 1984. Hilo struggled to attract another overseas air carrier. Meantime, in the summer of 1983 there were three airlines operating nonstop service on the interisland route between Hilo and Honolulu including Aloha Airlines with Boeing 737-200 jets, Hawaiian Airlines with McDonnell Douglas DC-9-50 jets and de Havilland Canada DHC-7 Dash 7 turboprops, and Mid Pacific Air with NAMC YS-11 turboprops with the three air carriers operating a combined total of seventeen daily nonstop flights at this time from Hilo to Honolulu according to the OAG. Mid Pacific Air later introduced Fokker F28 Fellowship jets on its nonstop flights to Honolulu.

In May 1989, the state Legislature renamed General Lyman Field to "Hilo International Airport". Among the reasons given was to reorient the airport's image and to "conform to the practice of naming airports for their geographical locations". The main terminal kept the Lyman name.

Efforts finally had some success on April 28, 2006, when ATA Airlines re-established daily non-stop service between Hilo and Oakland International Airport in California aboard its Boeing 737-800 aircraft. ATA Airlines' inauguration of direct overseas service to Hilo for the first time in nearly two decades was met with great fanfare and proved so successful the airline eventually substituted the larger Boeing 757-200 on its flights to Hilo during the peak traveling season around August. Just shy of two years later on April 2, 2008, ATA Airlines ceased operations, citing the cancellation of an agreement by FedEx that provided most of the company's charter flights, and the unprecedented increase in fuel prices. ATA was acquired by U.S. carrier Southwest Airlines, which did not operate any overseas routes at the time. Southwest then announced their intention to serve Hawaii from California. The demise of ATA Airlines left Hilo without overseas service once again.

In the wake of ATA's bankruptcy, the Hawaii Tribune-Herald reported an undisclosed major U.S. Airline was considering service to Hilo. New mainland service was announced on December 15, 2010, when Continental Airlines announced that it would begin to fly to Hilo from both San Francisco and Los Angeles in June 2011. These flights were operated by United Airlines after the merger between the two carriers in 2011. Daily flights to and from Los Angeles commenced on June 9, 2011, and Saturday-only service to and from San Francisco on June 11, 2011. In 2013, United dropped service to San Francisco. Service to Los Angeles was decreased to five flights per week. However, United dropped service to Los Angeles in 2023.

Nonstop services to the mainland U.S. from Hilo returned when Southwest Airlines announced three weekly flights to Las Vegas (LAS) starting in August 2026.

== Facilities ==
Hilo International Airport facilities

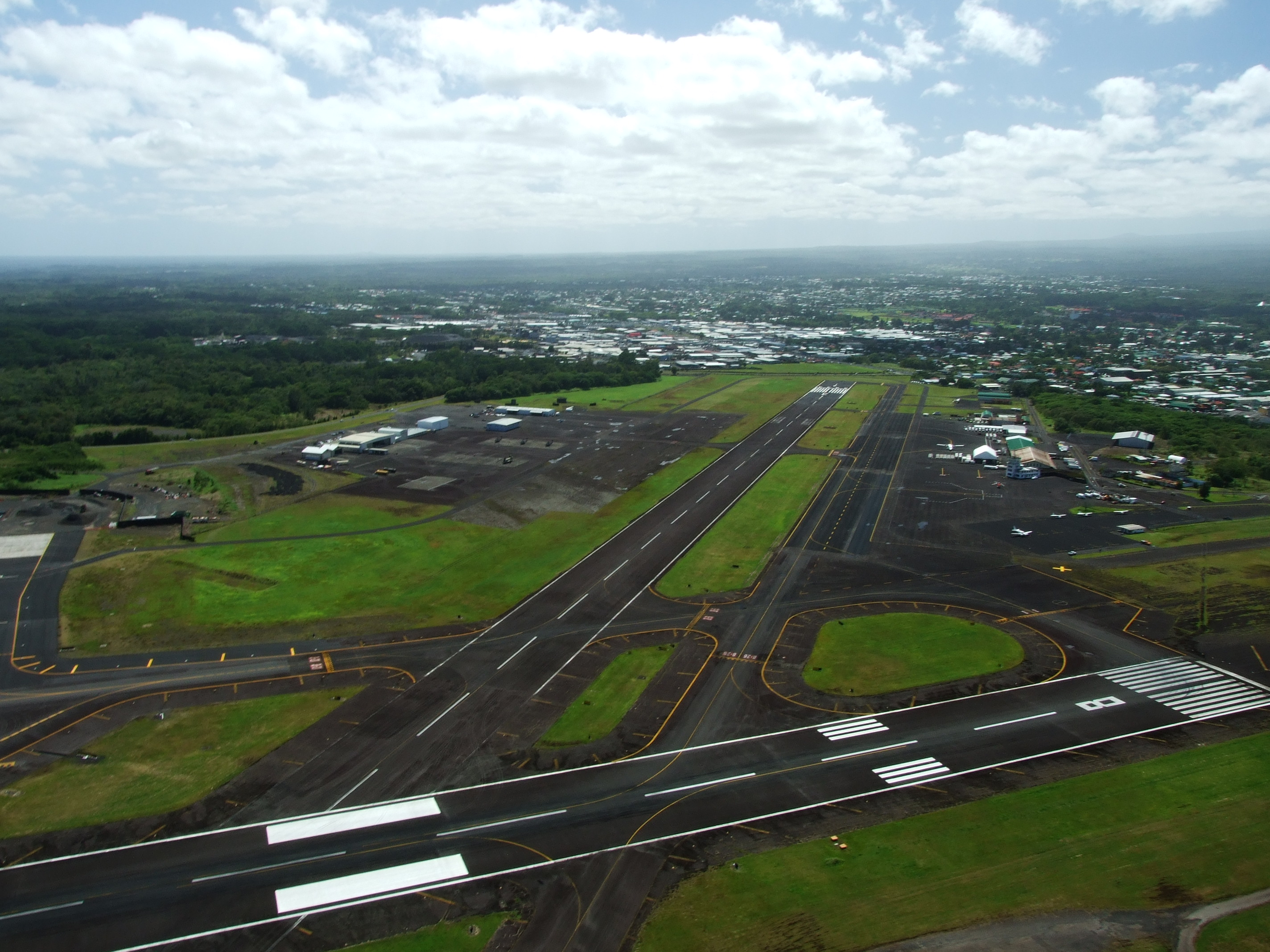
View of runways, directed south; west end of Runway 8/26 is prominent on the right side of the photograph.

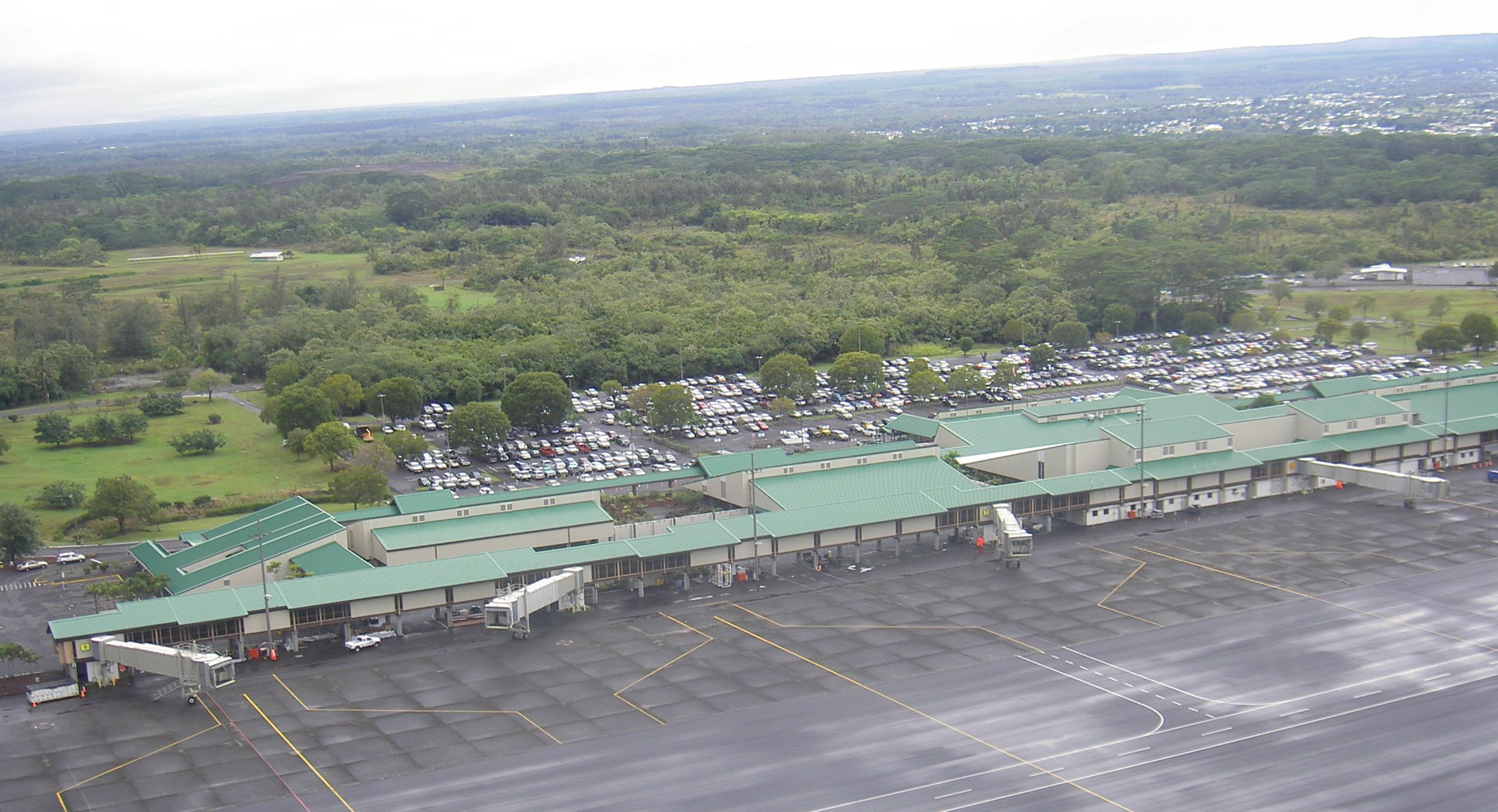
Aerial view of terminal (directed south); L-R: Gates 9, 8, 7, 6

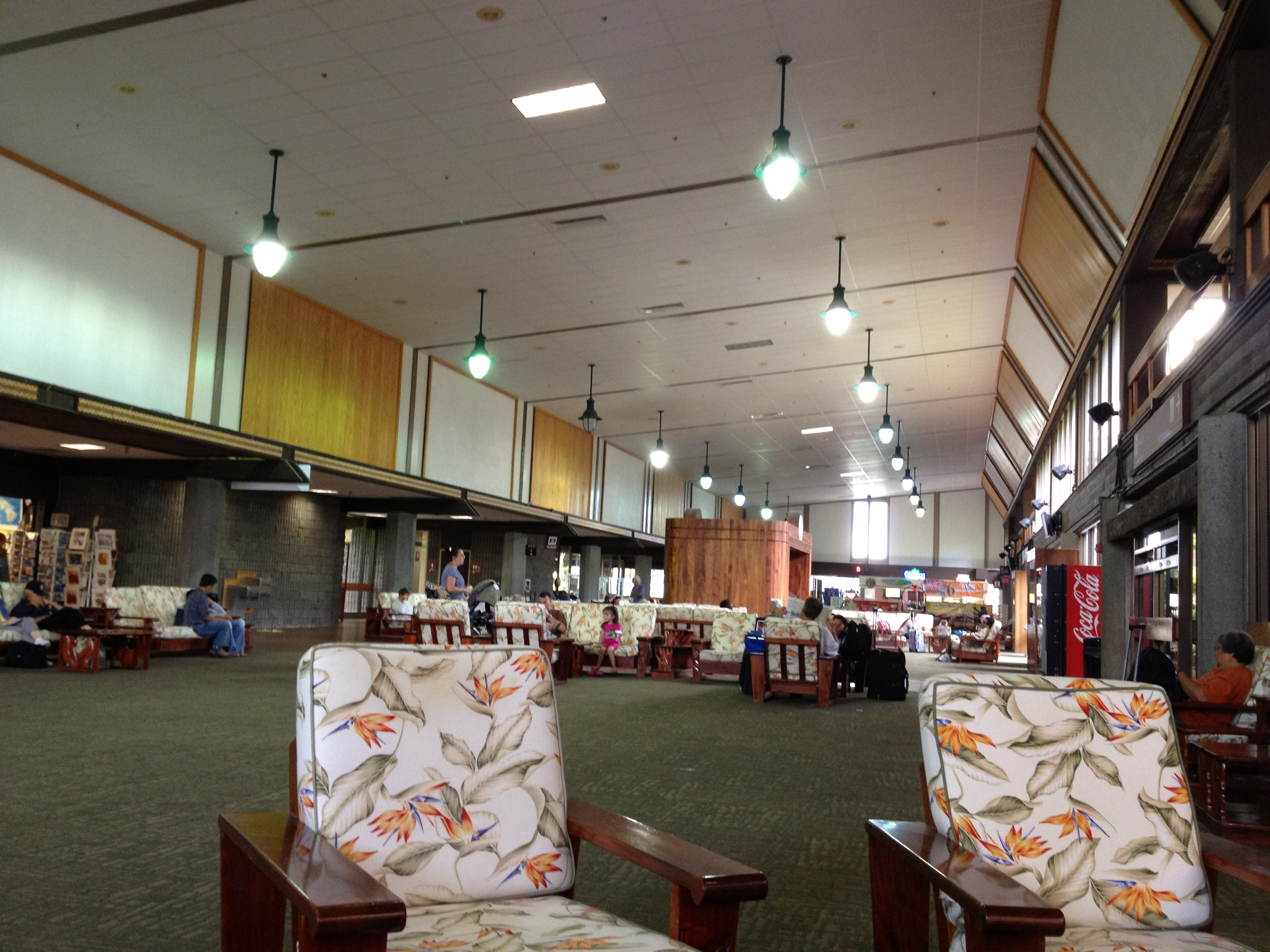
Waiting area inside Hilo Airport terminal

=== Runways ===
Hilo International Airport has two runways. Runway 8-26 is 9,800 ft × 150 ft (2,987 m × 46 m) and is used for nearly all air carrier operations. It is capable of accommodating overseas passenger service by aircraft as large as the Boeing 747 and is used occasionally by the Lockheed C-5 Galaxy, a USAF military transport. Runway 3/21 is 5,600 ft × 150 ft (1,707 m × 46 m) and is used for general aviation operations including take-off and landing of smaller commuter airplanes, although it is capable of handling smaller medium-sized aircraft such as the Boeing 737 and Airbus A320 should the need arise. In March 2022, there were 35 aircraft based at this airport: 10 single-engine, 3 multi-engine, 12 helicopter, 1 glider and 9 military.

=== Terminal area ===
The passenger terminal complex, including commuter facilities, is at the southern edge of Hilo International Airport and is served by an access roadway from Hawaii Belt Road at Kekūanaōʻa Avenue. Air Cargo operations are handled at the new cargo facility located on the southern edge of Runway 8-26. Hawaiian Air Cargo, Southwest Cargo, and Aloha Air Cargo, are three of the major cargo operations served here. Other cargo operations include FedEx, Kamaka Air, and ʻOHANA By Hawaiian Cargo. The Northwest Apron, which serves this area of the airport, provides parking for transient military aircraft and is the site of some general aviation facilities. Other general aviation facilities are located to the south, near the Civil Air Patrol area.

=== Air carrier passenger terminal ===
The main passenger terminal consists of three interconnected buildings totaling approximately 220,000 square feet (20,000 m^{2}). The central building consists of just under 120,000 square feet (11,000 m^{2}) of space while the western and eastern wings occupy slightly more than 50,000 square feet (4,600 m^{2}) each. Hawaiian Airlines operates a Premier Lounge at Hilo below Gate 6. The apron fronting the passenger terminal has ten aircraft parking positions, each able to accommodate a Boeing 747. Only eight of the positions are usable; two are used to provide eleven helicopter parking positions and there are just seven passenger loading bridges.

=== Commuter terminal ===
The commuter terminal is located in a small, stand alone building approximately 0.25 miles (0.40 km) to the west of the main passenger terminal. Safari Aviation, a helicopter tour company, currently leases the 4,040 square feet (375 m^{2}) building. Other aerial tour companies lease space in the western wing of General Lyman Terminal.

== Airlines and destinations ==
Hilo Airport is connected to Daniel K. Inouye International Airport (Honolulu) by Hawaiian Airlines and Southwest Airlines, to Kahului Airport by Hawaiian Airlines, and to Harry Reid International Airport (Las Vegas) by Southwest Airlines.

== Statistics ==
=== Top destinations ===
Busiest domestic routes from ITO (November 2024 – October 2025)
Rank	City	Passengers	Carriers
1	Honolulu, Hawaii	666,330	Hawaiian, Southwest
2	Kahului, Hawaii	34,200	Hawaiian
3	Las Vegas, Nevada	36,500	Southwest

== Issues facing Hilo International Airport ==
=== Underutilization ===
Although designed as the second gateway into and out of Hawaiʻi, Hilo is Hawaiʻi's only major airport lacking non-stop flights to North America.

Today, Hilo International Airport is the smallest of the state's five major airports in terms of passenger arrivals and departures. Kona Airport and Līhuʻe Airport generally serve twice as many passengers as Hilo, while Maui's Kahului Airport typically sees four times as many travelers. Moreover, while other airports grew significantly over the past several decades, Hilo International Airport has seen little long-term increase in air traffic.

In 1973, for example, the total passenger count at Hilo International Airport was 1,357,818. In 2008, that number stood at 1,352,808. Total traffic at Hilo peaked in 1997 with 1,669,314 people. An almost identical number of passengers, 1,667,163, passed through the airport in 2007. As a result, Hilo International Airport operates considerably below its capacity.

The primary reason for Hilo International Airport's relatively stagnant passenger count is the lack of tourism within the airport's service area, which includes the districts of Hilo and Puna, as well as portions of the districts of Hāmākua and Kaʻū, relative to the Kona district and Kohala district and the islands of Kauaʻi and Maui. In 2008, visitor hotel rooms and condominiums on Hawaiʻi island totaled 11,240 units. Of these, 9,576 (85.2%) were in the districts of Kona and Kohala. A mere 1,635 (14.5%) were within the districts of Hāmākua, Hilo, and Puna. In 2008, the respective numbers of visitor accommodations on Maui and Kauaʻi were 19,055 and 9,203. In fact, whereas the number of visitor accommodations elsewhere in the state climbed steadily since the 1970s, in east Hawaiʻi island several hotels have been shuttered or converted into apartments or condominiums.

=== Noise ===
Hilo International Airport's proximity to residential areas has made noise abatement a persistent concern in the airport's development and operations. Exacerbating the impact of airport activity on nearby residential neighborhoods is the fact that Hilo's climate favors single wall, open air construction to take advantage of natural ventilation provided by trade winds. This results in minimal outdoor to indoor noise attenuation.

Complaints about airport noise have been received from locations including downtown Hilo, hotels and condominiums along Banyan Drive, and Keaukaha. In response, the Hawaiʻi State Department of Transportation implemented measures designed to mitigate airport noise.

Over 95% of aircraft operations take place on Runway 8-26 because the orientation of Runway 3-21 makes direct flights over residential and commercial areas unavoidable. Night and early morning flights are directed to arrive from and depart towards the east, where largely vacant land acts as a noise buffer. Day flights maintain a west to east pattern. Although this results in arriving aircraft coming closer to the downtown area, pilots attempt to remain over Hilo Bay for as long as possible before aligning their aircraft with the runway, crossing over near the Hilo Iron Works building. Also, aircraft landings are quieter than take-offs. All aircraft, in fact, are directed to avoid overflying residential and commercial areas to the extent possible. In addition, the U.S. military transferred some of its training activities to Kona International Airport. However, the military will occasionally do training exercises using the C-17 Globemaster and F-22 Raptor.

Other proposed noise mitigation measures include a barrier on the north side of the airport and the extension of Runway 8-26 by 1,850 feet (560 m) to the east and displacing the western end of the runway by the same amount, thereby maintaining the runway's length. Community opposition to the construction of a barrier led the State to abandon the idea. It remains unclear if the Hawaiʻi State Department of Transportation will proceed with relocating Runway 8-26 east by 1,850 feet, especially given the 2009 demise of Aloha Airlines, whose older generation Boeing 737-200 fleet was considerably louder than Hawaiian Airlines' relatively modern Boeing 717-200s. However, those Boeing 737 aircraft are still being used by Trans Executive Airlines which continues with night flights to Honolulu. Southwest and United operate the Boeing 737-800 which makes a considerable amount of noise while taking off and landing.

== Accidents and incidents ==
- On January 6, 1967, a Curtiss C-46 Commando operated by Channel Air Lift crashed at General Lyman Field. A shift in cargo during takeoff caused the aircraft to stall and crash attempting to return to the airport. All three occupants were killed.
- On April 28, 1988, an Aloha Airlines Boeing 737-200 operating Flight 243 from General Lyman Field (as Hilo International Airport was known then) to Daniel K. Inouye International Airport (Honolulu International Airport) carrying 89 passengers and 5 crew members experienced rapid decompression when an 18 feet (5.5 m) section of the fuselage roof and sides were torn from the airplane. One flight attendant was blown out of the airplane and died. Several passengers sustained life-threatening injuries including instances of massive head wounds. The aircraft declared an emergency and landed at Kahului Airport on Maui. Investigations of the incident concluded that the accident was caused by metal fatigue. The incident caused almost all major United States air carriers to re-examine their oldest airplane models and those with the most "cycles" or flights. Many older aircraft were retired or phased out after these checks.
- On October 7, 2011, a Cessna 310 piloted by a 65-year-old pilot coming from Monterey, California, declared an emergency landing at about 12:30 pm. The plane was low on fuel, so it made a water landing 13 miles offshore of the Big Island.

== See also ==
- List of airports in Hawaii
- Hawaii World War II Army Airfields
