= South African Airlink Flight 8911 =

2009 aviation accident

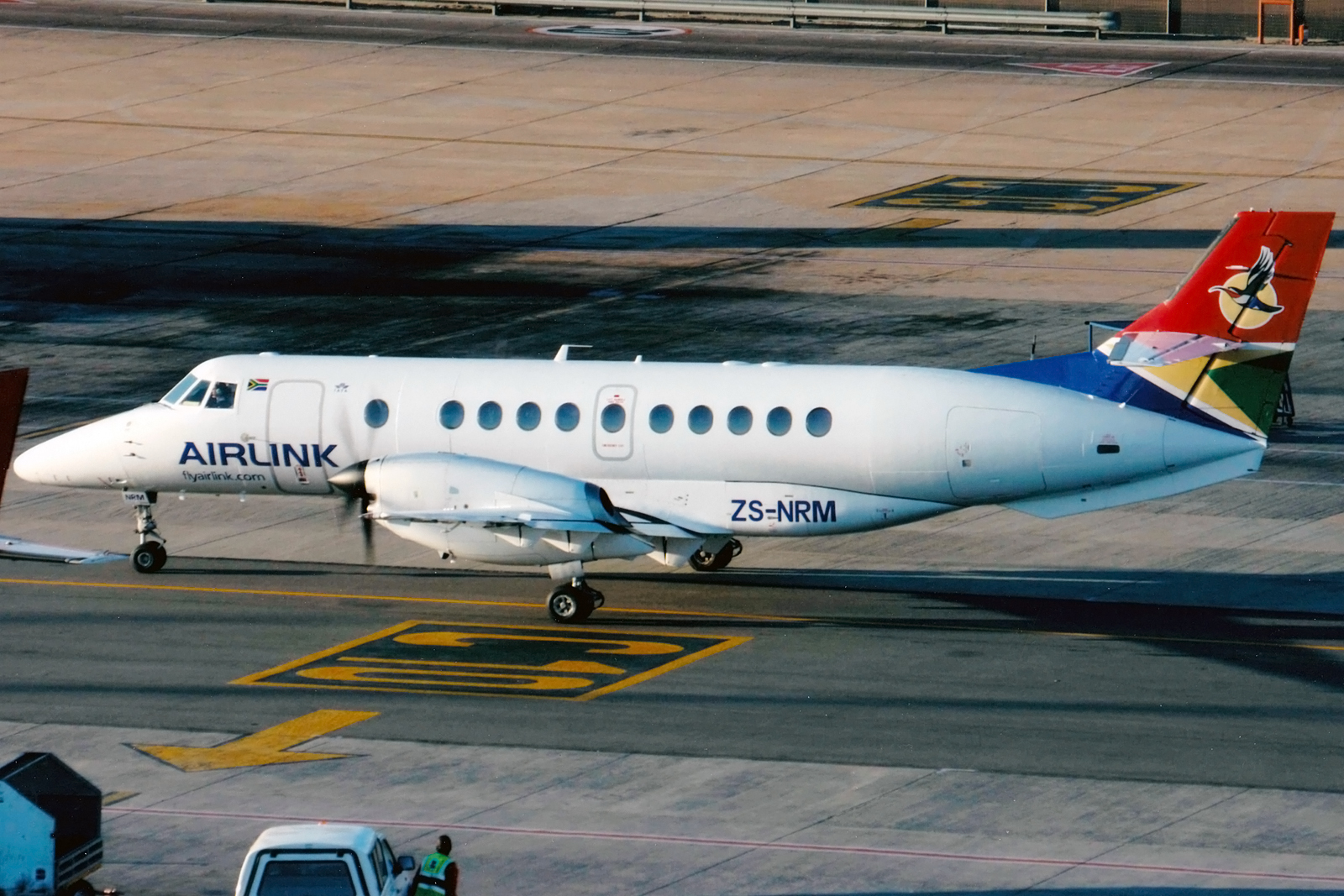
- ZS-NRM, the South African Airlink BAe Jetstream 41 involved in the accident, seen in 2008

Accident
- Date: 24 September 2009
- Summary: Engine failure leading to pilot error; shut-down of operating engine
- Site: Durban International Airport, Durban, South Africa; 29°57′18″S 30°58′14″E
- Total fatalities: 1
- Total injuries: 3

Aircraft
- Aircraft type: BAe Jetstream 41
- Operator: South African Airlink
- IATA flight No.: SA8911
- ICAO flight No.: LNK911
- Call sign: LINK 911
- Registration: ZS-NRM
- Flight origin: Durban International Airport
- Destination: Pietermaritzburg Airport
- Occupants: 3
- Passengers: 0
- Crew: 3
- Fatalities: 1
- Injuries: 2
- Survivors: 2

Ground casualties
- Ground fatalities: 0
- Ground injuries: 1

South African Airlink Flight 8911, a positioning flight from Durban International Airport to Pietermaritzburg Airport (both in South Africa), operated by a British Aerospace Jetstream 41, crashed into the grounds of Merebank Secondary School, Durban shortly after take-off on 24 September 2009, injuring the three occupants of the aircraft and one on the ground. The captain of the flight subsequently died of his injuries on 7 October 2009.

== Flight ==
The flight was a positioning flight (ferry flight) from Durban to Pietermaritzburg, carrying no passengers. The three crew members consisted of Captain Allister Freeman, First officer Sonja Bierman, and a flight attendant. Captain Freeman had previously been involved in an accident in which the Britten-Norman BN-2 Islander he was flying experienced an engine failure and crashed into a house in Durban. All six people on board survived.

The aircraft, a BAe Jetstream 41 with registration ZS-NRM, had only flown 50 hours since its last service. The aircraft had been diverted to Durban from Pietermaritzburg the previous evening by bad weather.

== Crash ==
At around 8:00 a.m. local time (06:00 UTC) on 24 September 2009, the flight departed Durban International Airport. Shortly after takeoff, the crew reported loss of engine power and smoke from the rear of the aircraft, and declared an emergency. Witnesses reported the aircraft flying at an unusually low altitude, and that the pilot was attempting to ditch the aircraft in vacant land surrounding Merebank Secondary School approximately 400 metres (440 yd) from the threshold of Runway 24 at Durban International Airport. The school was closed on the day of the accident because it was Heritage Day, a public holiday. The pilot ditched the aircraft on the sports field of the school, avoiding hitting nearby residential properties; the aircraft broke into three pieces on impact.

== Rescue ==
Rescue workers arrived on the scene shortly after the crash and cut the three crew members out of the wreckage using hydraulic rescue tools. The captain was airlifted to St. Augustine's Hospital at 11:00 a.m. local time (09:00 UTC) in a critical condition; the critically injured first officer and seriously injured flight attendant were taken to other nearby hospitals. A street cleaner on the school's perimeter was struck by the plane and was taken to the hospital. The captain died of his injuries on 7 October 2009.

== Investigation ==
Investigators from the South African Civil Aviation Authority (CAA) were dispatched to the crash scene; the CAA conducted an on-site investigation to determine the possible cause of the crash. The flight data recorder and cockpit voice recorder were retrieved and used in the investigation. British Aerospace, the manufacturer of the aircraft, dispatched a team of technical experts to assist in the investigation should they have been required by the CAA.

On 9 October 2009, the CAA issued a press release requesting the public's assistance in finding a bearing cap from one of the engines. The cap, which possibly separated from the engine during takeoff, could not be found at the crash site or at the airport.

On 23 December 2009, the CAA issued the following press release : "In the case of the FADN (Merebank) accident the initial cause appears to be that of an engine failure during take-off which finally resulted in an accident when the human factor involvement resulted in the wrong engine being shut down. This type of engine failure has occurred previously and the cause is known to the manufacturer."

In 2011, the CAA released their final report on the accident. The right engine had failed at rotation due to its turbine seal plate separating and the crew mishandled the situation; First officer Bierman did correctly identify the right engine, but Captain Freeman accidentally feathered the still-functioning left engine, making a forced landing "inevitable."

== See also ==
- British Midland Airways Flight 92 - A Boeing 737-4Y0 that crashed under similar circumstances
- TransAsia Airways Flight 235 - An ATR 72-600 that crashed under similar circumstances
- Azerbaijan Airlines Flight A-56 - A Tupolev Tu-134B-3 that crashed under similar circumstances
- Transair Flight 810 - A Boeing 737-200 that crashed under similar circumstances
- Edinburgh Air Charter Flight 3W - A Cessna 404 Titan that crashed under similar circumstances
- 2020 United States Air Force E-11A crash - A Bombardier E-11A that crashed under similar circumstances
