= Azerbaijan Airlines Flight A-56 =

1995 aviation accident

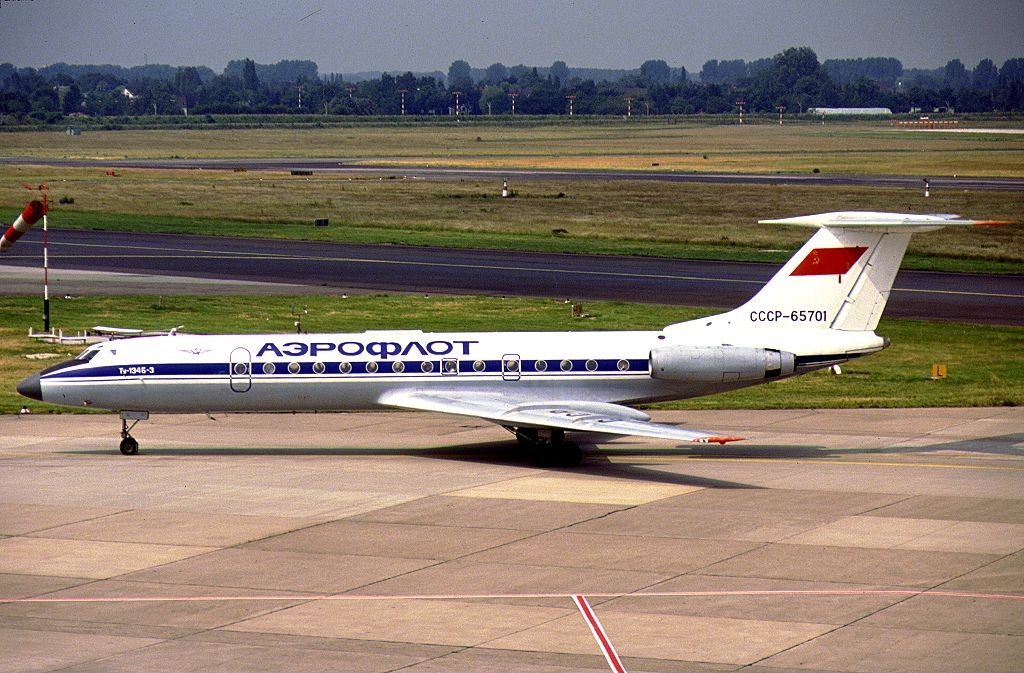
- A Tu-134B-3 similar to the accident aircraft

Accident
- Date: 5 December 1995
- Summary: Engine failure, inadvertent shut-down of serviceable engine
- Site: Nakhchivan Airport; 39°11′50″N 45°23′40″E

Aircraft
- Aircraft type: Tupolev Tu-134B-3
- Operator: Azerbaijan Airlines
- Registration: 4K-65703
- Flight origin: Nakhchivan Airport (NAJ/UBBN), Nakhchivan
- Destination: Baku-Bina International Airport (BAK/UBBB), Baku
- Occupants: 82
- Passengers: 76
- Crew: 6
- Fatalities: 52
- Injuries: 30
- Survivors: 30

Locations within Azerbaijan

Azerbaijan Airlines Flight A-56 was a scheduled domestic passenger flight operated by Azerbaijan Airlines, from Nakhchivan Airport to Baku, which crashed whilst attempting an emergency landing on 5 December 1995, killing 52 out of the 82 people on board. The twin-engine aircraft operating the flight, a Tupolev Tu-134, experienced an engine failure shortly after take-off, but the second engine that was operable was shut down in error. The pilots attempted a forced landing, which resulted in the aircraft crashing in the south-western outskirts of Nakhchivan, 3.85 km (2.4 miles) from the airport runway.

== Aircraft ==
The Tu-134B-3 involved in the accident was manufactured on 28 August 1980 and was powered by two Soloviev D-30 turbofan engines. The aircraft had flown 27,500 hours of its 35,000 flight hour life before the crash, was last serviced on 25 July 1995, and an unspecified repair was carried out on 30 March 1993. The engines had operated roughly 16,000 hours out of their assigned 18,000 hour life and were last serviced on 27 November 1995. The no. 1 (left) engine had undergone eight unspecified repairs and the no. 2 (right) five unspecified repairs before the crash.

== Crash ==
The aircraft took off from Nakhchivan at 17:52 local time. At an altitude of 60 metres (200 ft) and an airspeed of 317 km/h (171 kn; 197 mph), the no. 1 engine failed. The co-pilot Sergey Kuliyev, who was at the controls, responded by countering the left bank, but five seconds later the flight engineer Alexander Sokolov reported, in error, that the no. 2 engine had failed. The captain Eduard Hasanov took over control of the aircraft. However, because the co-pilot had countered the left bank, the captain did not have the sensory information which could have alerted him that it was the no. 1 engine that had failed. The aircraft continued to climb. The captain then ordered the no. 2 engine to be shut down. The flight engineer retarded the right throttle and noticed that the power on the working engine was decreasing, he then pushed the no. 2 throttle back to full power, but the no. 2 engine had already stopped. Eight seconds later, the flight engineer reported that both engines had failed. The aircraft climbed to an altitude of 197 metres (646 ft), while the speed had decreased to 290 kilometres per hour (160 kn; 180 mph). The captain decided to make an emergency landing, but encountered an apartment block and made a sharp right turn to avoid it. The aircraft crashed into a field with a 37-degree right bank and a sink rate of 10 m/s (2,000 ft/min). Thirty people out of eighty-two on board survived the accident (twenty-six passengers and four crew members).

== Investigation ==
A joint investigation by the Russian Interstate Aviation Committee, the aircraft manufacturer, engine manufacturer and Azerbaijani Ministry of National Security was launched. Azerbaijan Airlines believed defective spare parts caused the crash. The joint investigation commission found that vibration caused the nuts on the engine mounts to loosen and fall off. This caused the engine turbines to shift and become damaged, leading to the crash. Azerbaijan Airlines deputy head Nazim Javadov, however, said the use of the defective parts for repairs was permitted by the Russian engine manufacturer, Perm Motors.

== See also ==
- Kegworth air disaster – another accident involving misidentification of a failing engine
- TransAsia Airways Flight 235
- SA Airlink Flight 8911
- Edinburgh Air Charter Flight 3W
- Transair Flight 810
- 2020 United States Air Force E-11A crash
