= Transair Flight 810 =

2021 aircraft accident in Hawaii

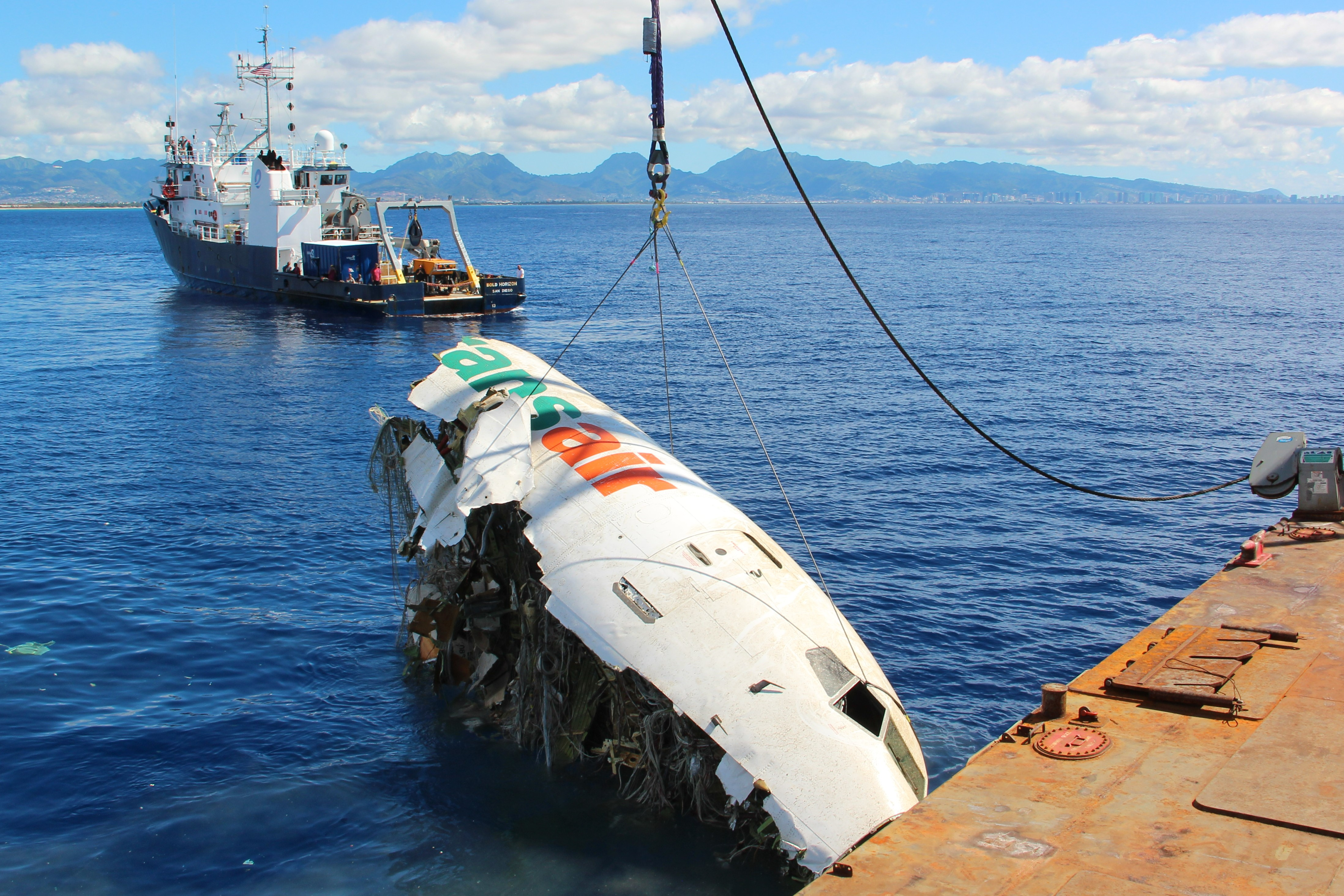
- The cockpit section of the aircraft being recovered from Māmala Bay

Accident
- Date: July 2, 2021
- Summary: Engine failure, followed by erroneous shut down of operating engine, leading to ditching
- Site: Māmala Bay, Oahu; 21.275°N 158.026°W

Aircraft
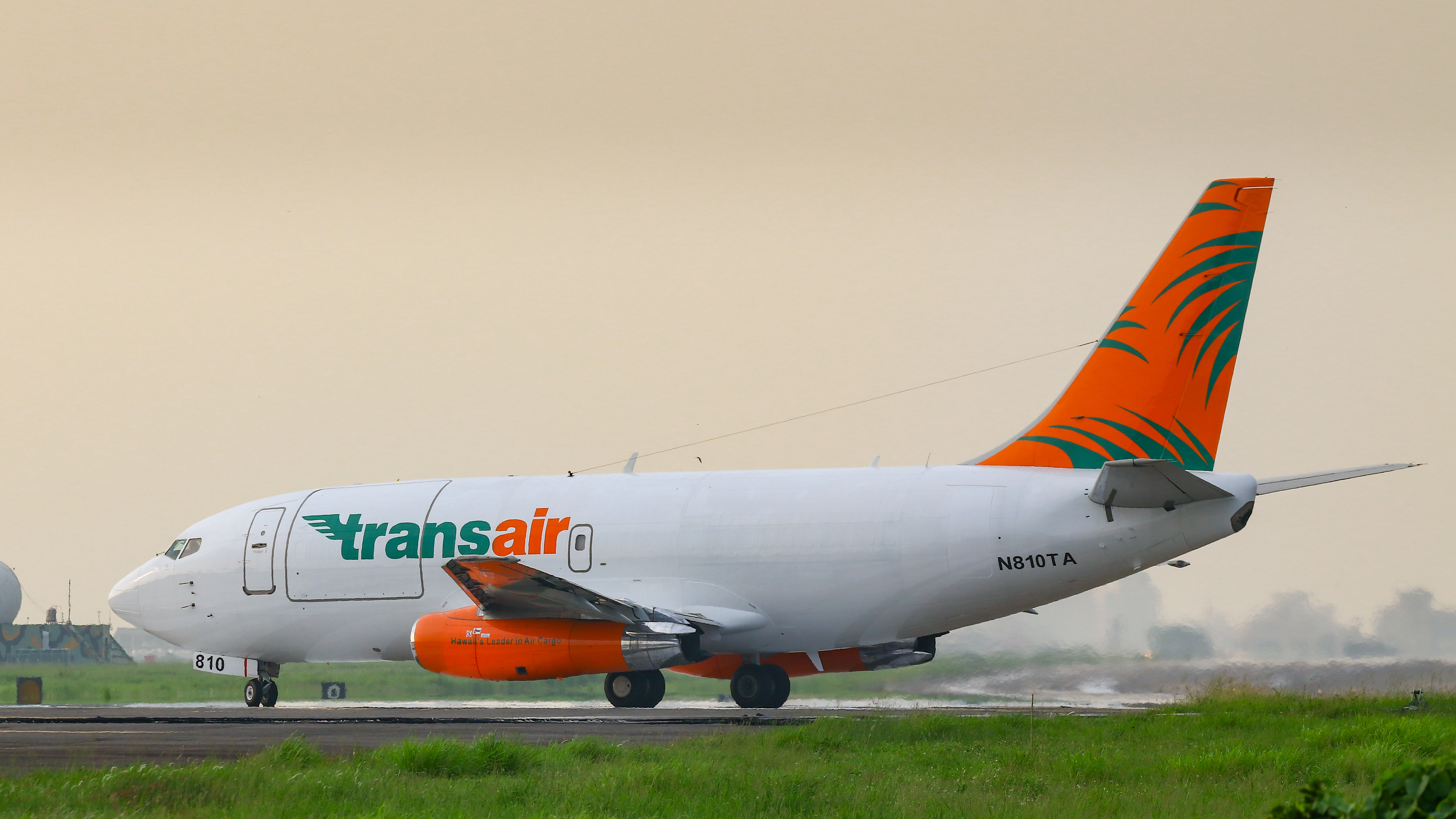
- N810TA, the aircraft involved in the accident, seen in 2019
- Aircraft type: Boeing 737-275C (Note: The 2 in the suffix denotes that it was a -200 series variant of the 737; 75 is the Boeing customer code for Pacific Western Airlines. The C in the model code designates that this aircraft was originally built as a 737-200 Combi, a specialized model of the aircraft that was designed to carry both passengers and freight on the main deck of the aircraft, separated by a movable bulkhead. Adv stands for Advanced, meaning it was a later variant with improved capacity and range over the original -200.)
- Operator: Rhoades Aviation operating under Transair
- IATA flight No.: T4810
- ICAO flight No.: RDS810
- Call sign: RHOADES EXPRESS 810
- Registration: N810TA
- Flight origin: Daniel K. Inouye International Airport
- Destination: Kahului Airport
- Occupants: 2
- Crew: 2
- Fatalities: 0
- Injuries: 2
- Survivors: 2

Transair Flight 810 was a scheduled cargo flight operated by a Boeing 737-200 converted freighter aircraft, owned and operated by Rhoades Aviation under the Transair trade name, on a short cargo flight from Honolulu International Airport on the island of Oahu to Kahului Airport on the neighboring Hawaiian island of Maui on July 2, 2021. Immediately after an early morning takeoff, one of its two Pratt & Whitney JT8D turbofan engines faltered, and the first officer reduced power to both engines. The two pilots—the only occupants of the aircraft—became preoccupied with talking to air traffic control and performing other flying tasks, and did not follow proper procedures to positively identify the problem. The captain misidentified the failing engine, increased power to that engine, and did not increase power to the other, properly functioning engine. Convinced that neither engine was working properly and unable to maintain altitude with one engine faltering and the other idling, the pilots ditched into Honolulu's Māmala Bay off the coast of Oahu about 11 minutes into the flight.

Both pilots were rescued about an hour after the accident in a response involving aircraft and boats from multiple agencies. They were hospitalized and later released. The wreckage was located the following week at a depth of about 420 feet (130 m), 2 miles (3 km) off Ewa Beach and was subsequently recovered.

The Federal Aviation Administration (FAA) and National Transportation Safety Board (NTSB) immediately began investigating the accident. Transair voluntarily withdrew its four remaining 737s from service for an internal review. Transair resumed flying their one operational 737-200 a week later, but subsequently had to cease 737 operations due to deficiencies identified by the FAA prior to the ditching. The NTSB report cited the pilots' ineffective crew resource management, high workload, and stress.

== Flight ==
On July 2, 2021, at 1:33 a.m. HST, the aircraft began its take-off from Daniel K. Inouye International Airport (HNL) just west of Honolulu on the southern coast of Oahu. The captain was 58-year-old Henry Okai, an experienced pilot with around 15,781 hours of flying time, 871 on the Boeing 737-200. The first officer was 50-year-old Gregory Ryan, also an experienced pilot with around 5,272 hours of flying time, 908 of them on the Boeing 737-200. At around 1:42 a.m., after air traffic control (ATC) had cleared the flight to climb to 13,000 feet (4,000 m), the pilots informed Honolulu tower that the aircraft had "lost an engine." Publicly available flight data show the aircraft had only climbed to around 2,100 feet (640 m).

The tower controller offered an immediate return for landing, but the crew instead requested delay vectors to run a checklist. They continued on a southwest heading, away from the airport. At around 1:46 a.m., the crew reported that an engine had overheated and mistaken the left engine being inoperative instead of the right engine and shut off the wrong engine, a few minutes later they realised they would not be able maintain altitude for much longer and knew they had to do something quickly.

After turning back toward Honolulu, the aircraft continued to lose altitude, so the controller issued a low-altitude alert and asked if they wanted to go to the closer Kalaeloa Airport instead. The first officer's transmission "We'd like the closest airport runway, please" was one of the last transmissions recorded from the aircraft. The plane went down on the water of Māmala Bay about 2 miles (3 km) short of Kalaeloa Airport. The captain sustained serious injuries and the first officer sustained minor injuries as a result of the accident.

== Search and rescue ==
U.S. Coast Guard Joint Rescue Coordination Center Honolulu watchstanders received a report from Honolulu Air Traffic Control of a downed Boeing 737 offshore. In response, the Coast Guard issued a notice to mariners, launched a Eurocopter MH-65 Dolphin helicopter and HC-130 Hercules airplane from Coast Guard Air Station Barbers Point (co-located at the Kalaeloa Airport), sent out a 45-foot Response Boat – Medium crew, and diverted the cutter Joseph Gerczak. In addition to the Coast Guard, multiple other agencies deployed, including Emergency Medical Services. The Hawaii Department of Transportation’s ARFF boat based at the Honolulu International Airport also responded and took approximately 30 to 40 minutes to get to the scene after navigating through a mile-wide debris field.

Coast Guard FLIR video showing rescue of two pilots. Thumbnail shows rescue swimmer being hoisted aboard helicopter

The Coast Guard helicopter located a fuel slick and wreckage at around 2:30 a.m. Both pilots had escaped through the cockpit windows, and the captain was seen clinging to the vertical tail (the only part of the aircraft that could still be seen floating above the waves), while the first officer was in the water floating on a bed of cargo soaked in jet fuel. The captain was at the point of exhaustion and not fully responsive when he was hoisted aboard the helicopter. The first officer was lifted on board the ARFF rescue boat.

Both were taken to The Queen's Medical Center about 20 miles (32 km) away. The captain was hospitalized in critical condition; the first officer was taken to hospital with a minor head injury and multiple lacerations. Both men were released from the hospital within a few days.

A Coast Guard press release quoted a watchstander saying, "Our crews often train closely with our counterparts ... That training paid off and we were able to quickly deploy response assets to the scene and recover the two people aboard the aircraft."

At the time of the rescue, there were winds of 17 miles per hour (27 km/h; 15 kn) and seas up to 5 feet (1.5 m).

== Aircraft ==
The aircraft involved was a 45-year-old first-generation Boeing 737-200. From 1968 to 1988, Boeing built 1,114 of the 737-200 type, but by 2021, fewer than 60 were still flying worldwide. Scheduled passenger service using 737-200s largely ended in 2008 with the closure of Aloha Airlines (also based in Honolulu) but a few remained in passenger service in 2020. The aircraft was eventually taken out of passenger service, and later converted to a full freighter. In 1999, the converted airframe was re-registered to Transmile as 9M-PML in Malaysia until it was then re-registered by Transair in the United States as N810TA in 2014. It was one of five Boeing 737s in Rhoades Aviation Inc's Transair fleet.

=== Engines ===
The aircraft was powered by two Pratt & Whitney JT8D-9A engines. The engines were originally designed for the Boeing 727. Pratt & Whitney produced more than 14,000 of these engines before regular production ended in 1985. The company continued actively supplying parts and overhauling engines through 2021 when roughly 2,000 were still in use.

The FAA's Service Difficulty Reports database shows the aircraft involved, N810TA, experienced #1 (left) engine failure on takeoff twice in recent years, but with different engines each time. In a 2018 failure, the engine had accumulated 23,657 hours total time and 35,753 total cycles, while in a 2019 failure the engine had 71,706 total hours and 67,194 total cycles.

== Investigations ==
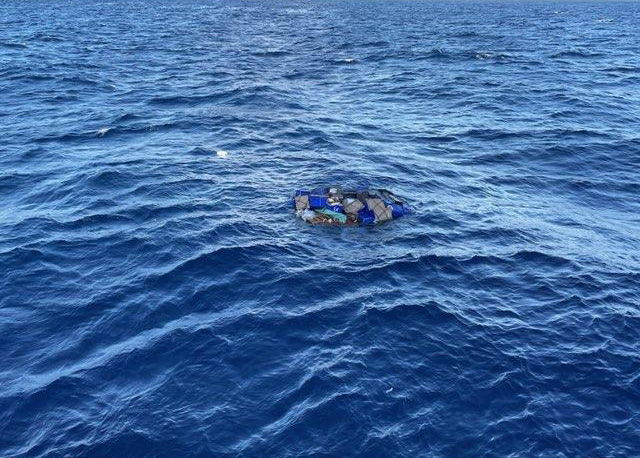
A portion of the aircraft's cargo, still secured by netting, floating among the debris field the day after the ditching

The following day, USCGC Joseph Gerczak completed collection of a small amount of incidental flotsam from the debris field to aid in the investigation. The NTSB examined the retrieved items, described as mostly general cargo.

In an initial statement, the Federal Aviation Administration (FAA) said, "The pilots had reported engine trouble and were attempting to return to Honolulu when they were forced to land the aircraft in the water ... The FAA and National Transportation Safety Board will investigate." The FAA would not comment on its current investigation, but a local investigative reporter for KHON-TV found more than a dozen FAA enforcement actions against Rhoades Aviation and Trans Executive Airlines of Hawaii (doing business as Transair), with fines that totaled over $200,000 over 25 years. A company representative declined to comment because they were a party to the ongoing NTSB investigation, but a former FAA Chief Counsel published critical commentary on the reporting, cautioning against drawing premature conclusions from potentially unrelated historical enforcement actions.

Transair voluntarily grounded its Boeing 737 cargo aircraft for a week after the accident. Then on July 15, Rhoades Aviation lost its FAA inspection authorization, after failing to ask for reconsideration of a June 13 notice of deficiencies identified during an FAA investigation that began in 2020. This effectively grounded Rhoades's fleet of 737-200s, which only included one remaining operational aircraft at the time. The FAA said the grounding was not a direct result of the ditching.

Transair had a contract to carry mail between the Hawaiian Islands, but the United States Postal Service said no mail was aboard this flight. They made alternate arrangements after Transair grounded its 737s.

The National Transportation Safety Board (NTSB) deployed a relatively large ten-investigator team to Oahu. Two investigators arrived later that day and began on-scene coordination, and the rest arrived by the next day. Team specialties included air traffic control, systems, maintenance records, human performance, operations, powerplants, and wreckage recovery.

The NTSB also announced that the manufacturers of the airframe and the engines, Boeing and Pratt & Whitney respectively, would be among the parties to the investigation. The NTSB stated, "In general terms, NTSB investigators develop factual information in three areas: the people involved in an accident, the equipment involved in the accident and the environment in which the accident occurred."

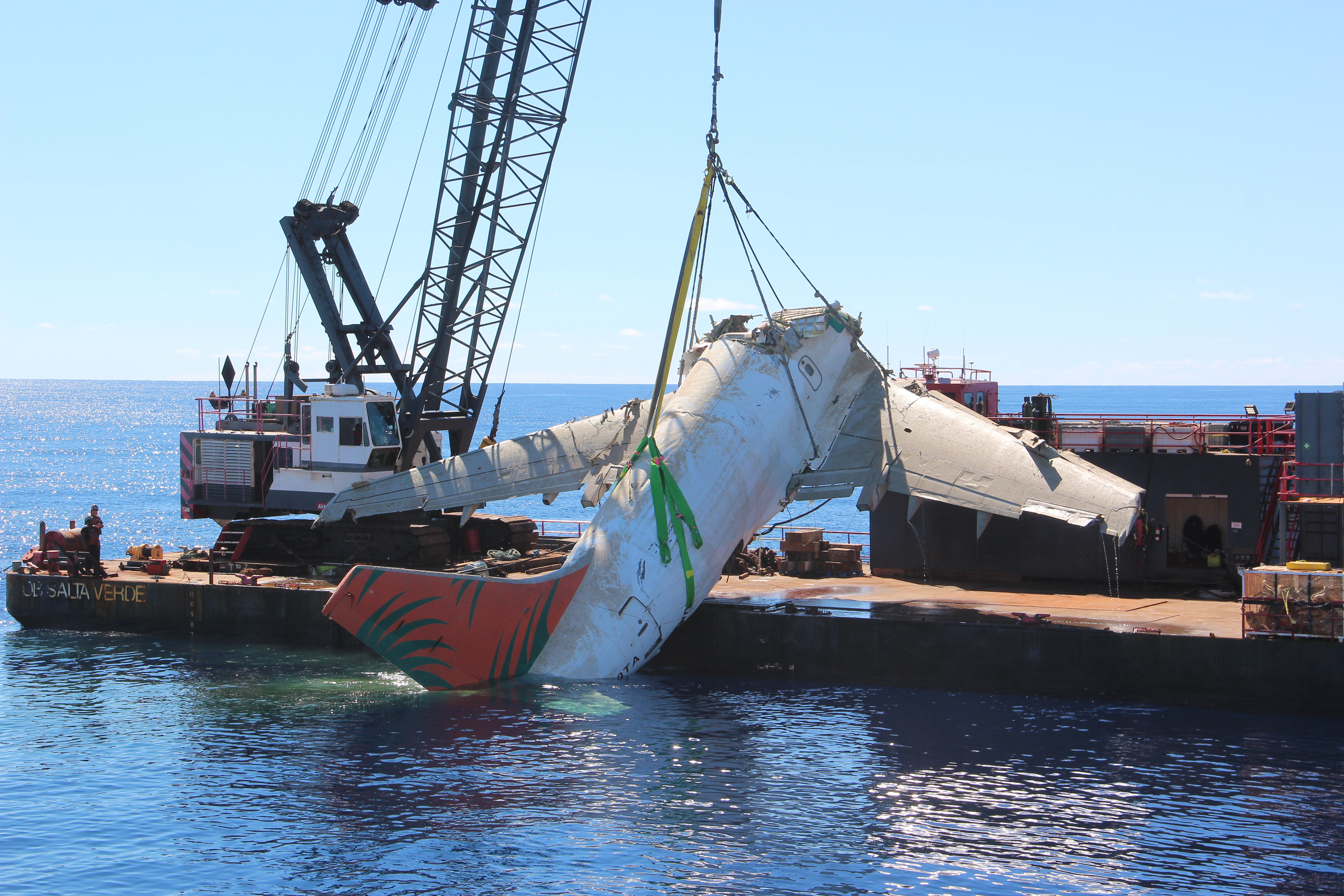
The same section being recovered almost four months later

NTSB met with the parties to the investigation the following day, and said it would use side-scan sonar to locate and evaluate the wreckage prior to attempting to recover the "black box" flight recorders. The wreckage was located the following week at depths between 360 and 420 ft (110–130 m)—below the depth where human divers could safely recover the flight recorders per the NTSB.

The NTSB also sampled fuel from another aircraft and found no anomalies. By the end of the following week, the on-site "go-team" had completed collection of the perishable evidence, including interviews of more than a dozen key personnel, and returned home, but the flight recorders remained with the wreckage at the bottom of the sea.

Photos from a remotely controlled SEAMOR Marine Chinook underwater vehicle showed that the fuselage broke ahead of the wing, with the nose section separated from the center section, but the inboard sections of both wings were still attached to the fuselage wing carry-through.

On May 25, 2022, citing numerous safety violations, including 33 flights undertaken with engines that were not airworthy, the FAA revoked Rhoades' air operator's certificate. The airline was given until June 8 to appeal the agency's decision.

On December 20, the NTSB released their investigation docket on the accident.

=== Recovery ===
The NTSB coordinated with the insurance company for Transair to begin an underwater recovery effort. A research vessel, RV Bold Horizon, with a 7,000-pound (3,200 kg). remotely operated underwater vehicle (ROV) owned and operated by subsea recovery specialists Eclipse Group Inc. was used to raise the engines and rig each fuselage section for hoisting to the surface by a derrick barge Salta Verde equipped with a crane working under contract to Eclipse Group Inc. The recovery is somewhat unusual in that the aircraft did not break up into small pieces during the accident. On November 2, the NTSB recovered both flight recorders as well as the aircraft's fuselage and engines.

Video of the recovery operation by the NTSB.

=== NTSB findings ===
The NTSB released their final report on the accident on June 15, 2023. They determined the cockpit voice recorder recorded a thud and subsequent vibrations during takeoff, and that oxidation and corrosion within the high-pressure turbine blades caused stress fractures and subsequent breakage, with secondary damage to the low-pressure turbine resulting in loss of thrust.

The NTSB found the pilots correctly identified a loss of thrust in the #2 (right) engine at the time of takeoff. The first officer reduced power on both engines after leveling off at 2,000 feet (610 m). The captain's preoccupation with communicating the emergency to ATC delayed response to the emergency. The first officer misidentified the left engine as "gone", possibly due to its lower engine power ratio compared to the right. The captain failed to verify the first officer's findings, assuming the first officer had a greater situational awareness, as the Captain was distracted with his communications with ATC and his belief that the first officer "never makes a mistake".

NTSB believes distraction with communicating the emergency to ATC caused the captain to have a delayed call for the start of the Engine Failure or Shutdown checklist. Starting the checklist earlier might have caused the first officer to recall their correct initial identification of the failing right engine. The first officer was not able to complete the engine failure checklist and the captain did not ensure its completion, indicative of ineffective crew resource management. The crew continued to use the damaged right engine, leaving the left undamaged engine on near-idle power. The insufficient thrust eventually rendered the plane unable to maintain altitude.

== In popular culture ==
The crash of Transair Flight 810 was featured in the 2025 episode "Pacific Ditching", of the Canadian-made, internationally distributed documentary series Mayday.

== See also ==
- Kegworth air disaster, TransAsia Airways Flight 235, SA Airlink Flight 8911, Azerbaijan Airlines Flight 56, Edinburgh Air Charter Flight 3W and 2020 United States Air Force E-11A crash - other cases of misidentification of failing engine
- List of airplane ditchings
