= Edinburgh Air Charter Flight 3W =

Aircraft accident

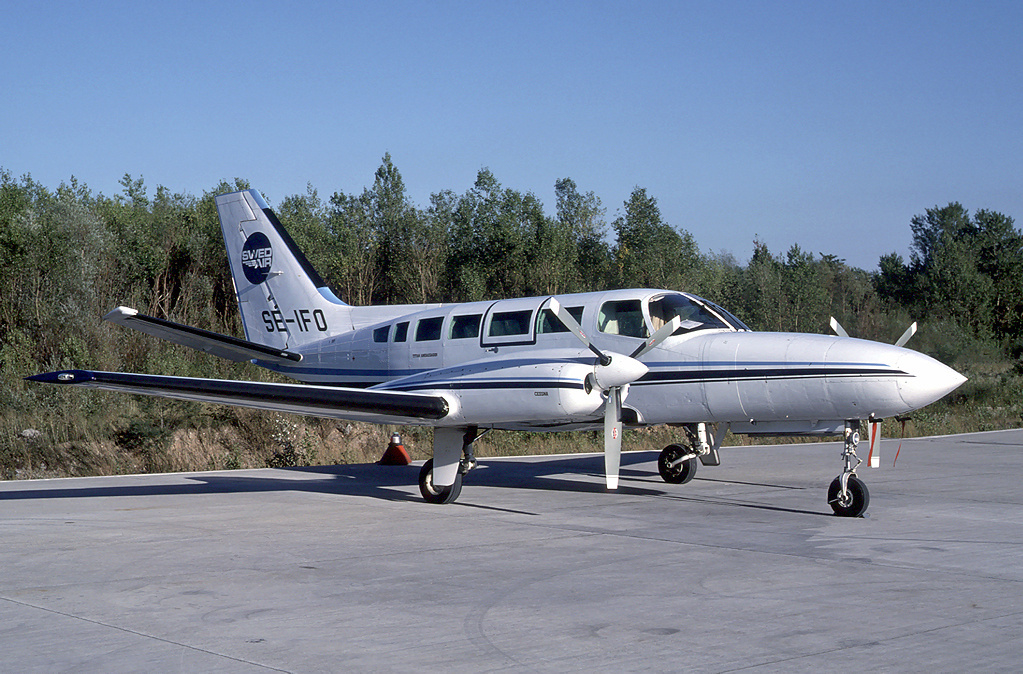
- A Cessna 404 Titan - similar to the accident aircraft

Accident
- Date: 3 September 1999
- Summary: Engine failure on takeoff, pilot error
- Site: 1 nm west of Glasgow Airport, Scotland; 55.863512°N 4.464143°W

Aircraft
- Aircraft type: Cessna 404 Titan
- Operator: Edinburgh Air Charter
- Call sign: SALTIRE 3 WHISKEY
- Registration: G-ILGW
- Flight origin: Glasgow Airport
- Destination: Aberdeen Airport
- Passengers: 9
- Crew: 2
- Fatalities: 8
- Injuries: 3
- Survivors: 3

Edinburgh Air Charter Flight 3W was a charter flight from Glasgow to Aberdeen. On 3 September 1999, an engine failed during takeoff at Glasgow. The aircraft then crashed short of the runway, killing 8 of the 11 people on board. The Cessna 404 Titan was chartered by Edinburgh Air Charter but operating with Airtours and carrying Airtours employees. Later they would board an actual Airtours Boeing 757 for Palma de Mallorca.

== Aircraft involved and crew ==
=== Aircraft ===
The aircraft was a Cessna 404 Titan Ambassador III, operated by Edinburgh Air Charter and owned by Fraggle Leasing Limited. G-ILGW had been manufactured by Cessna in 1980, and at the time of the accident had registered 6,532 operating hours. The aircraft was configured for two pilots and nine passengers, and powered by two Continental GTISO-520 engines.

=== Crew ===
The flight was crewed by 48-year-old John Eason and 54-year-old Bill Henderson who was operating as co-pilot. Eason had received his commercial pilot licence in 1990, and had around 4100 hours flying experience. Henderson had received his commercial pilot licence in April 1998, and had around 2000 hours flying experience.

== Accident ==
Shortly after takeoff, the left engine failed and the pilot-in-command feathered the right engine. Instead of attempting a crash landing, the pilot attempted to return to Glasgow Airport without engine power and lost control while trying to make a right turn. The aircraft crashed and caught fire approximately one nautical mile from the airport. The two Edinburgh Air Charter pilots, the Airtours First Officer, and five Airtours flight attendants died in the crash. The Airtours captain and two flight attendants survived.

== Investigation and aftermath ==
The aircraft was slightly overweight for the conditions. A report recommended engine inspections, more crash-worthy seats, and consideration to fitting aircraft like this with CVRs. As a result of this accident an airworthiness directive was issued by the British Civil Aviation Authority in June 2000, requiring inspections of the starter adapters and crankshaft gears on Continental GTSIO-520 series engines.

== See also ==
Other cases where pilots shut down the wrong engine when dealing with engine failure:

- British Midland Flight 092
- TransAsia Airways Flight 235
- South African Airlink Flight 8911
- Azerbaijan Airlines Flight A-56
- Transair Flight 810
- 2020 United States Air Force E-11A crash
