= Kegworth air disaster =

1989 aviation accident in England

Kegworth air disaster British Midland Airways Flight 092
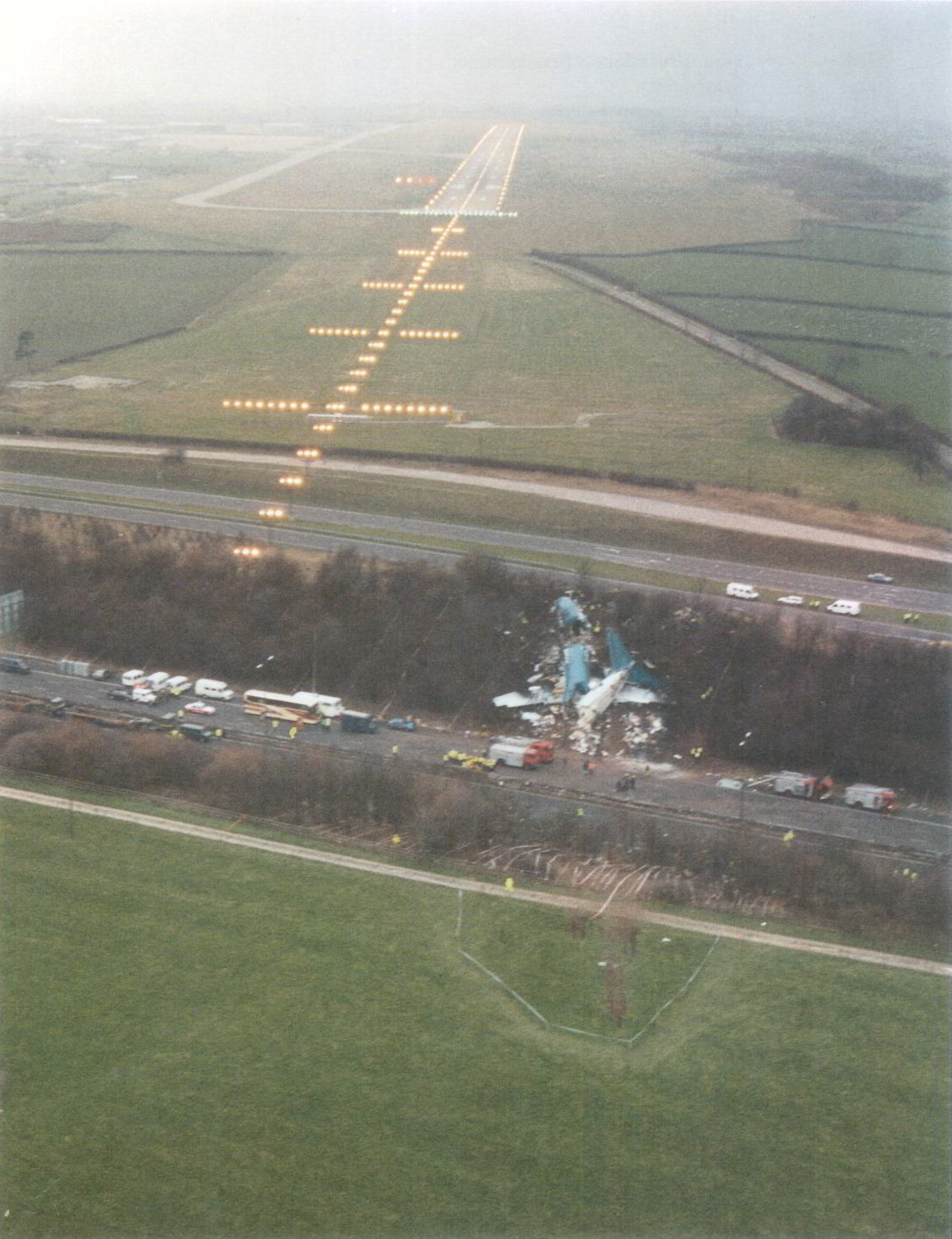
- Aerial view of the aircraft wreckage; the runway the aircraft failed to reach is at the top of the photograph

Accident
- Date: 8 January 1989
- Summary: Pilot error: Engine failure followed by erroneous shut-down of operating engine, stalled and crashed during emergency landing
- Site: East Midlands Airport, Kegworth, Leicestershire, England; 52°49′55″N 1°17′57.5″W

Aircraft
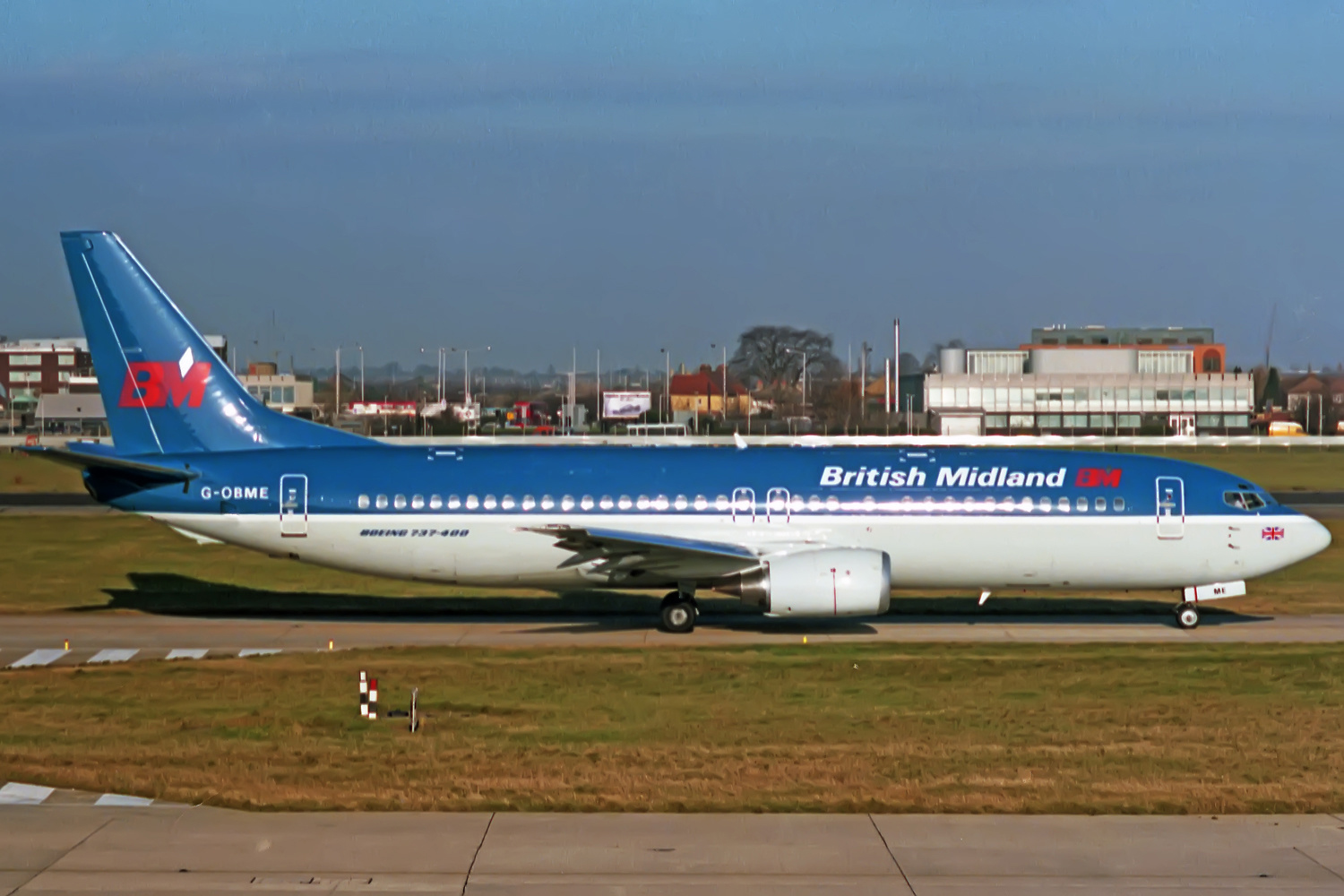
- G-OBME, the aircraft involved in the accident, pictured in 1988
- Aircraft type: Boeing 737-4Y0
- Operator: British Midland Airways
- IATA flight No.: BD092
- ICAO flight No.: BMA092
- Call sign: MIDLAND 092
- Registration: G-OBME
- Flight origin: London Heathrow Airport, England
- Destination: Belfast International Airport, Belfast, Northern Ireland
- Occupants: 126
- Passengers: 118
- Crew: 8
- Fatalities: 47
- Injuries: 74
- Survivors: 79

The Kegworth air disaster occurred when British Midland Airways Flight 092, a Boeing 737-400, crashed onto the motorway embankment between the M1 motorway and A453 road near Kegworth, Leicestershire, England, while attempting to make an emergency landing at East Midlands Airport on 8 January 1989.

The aircraft was on a scheduled flight from London Heathrow Airport to Belfast International Airport. When a fan blade broke in the left engine, smoke was drawn into the cabin through the air conditioning system. The pilots believed this indicated a fault in the right engine, since earlier models of the 737 ventilated the cabin from the right, and they were unaware that the 737-400 used a different system. The pilots retarded the right thrust lever and the symptoms of smoke and vibration cleared, leading them to believe the problem had been identified, and then the right engine was shut down.

On the final stage of the approach, thrust was increased on the left engine. The tip of the fan blade that had lodged in the cowling from the earlier event became dislodged and was drawn into the core of the engine, damaging it and causing a fire.

The fan blade had initially suffered a fracture caused by aerodynamic flutter. This knowledge made clear that static ground testing to discover the presence of flutter was unreliable and the fan blade had to be subjected to the full flight envelope to be certain of the test results.

The accident was the first hull loss of a Boeing 737 Classic aircraft, and the first fatal accident involving a Boeing 737 Classic aircraft. Of the 126 people aboard, 47 died and 74 sustained serious injuries.

== Aircraft involved and crew ==
=== Aircraft ===
The aircraft was a British Midland-operated Boeing 737-4Y0, (Note: The aircraft was a Boeing 737-400 model; Boeing assigns a unique customer code for each company that buys one of its aircraft, which is applied as a suffix to the model number at the time the aircraft is built. The code "Y0" was assigned to the leasing company Guinness Peat Aviation, from whom British Midland leased the aircraft.) registration G-OBME, on a scheduled flight from London Heathrow Airport to Belfast International Airport, Northern Ireland, having already flown from Heathrow to Belfast and back that day. The 737-400 was the newest design from Boeing, with the first unit entering service less than four months earlier, in September 1988. G-OBME had accumulated 521 airframe hours. The aircraft was powered by two CFM International CFM56 turbofan engines.

=== Cockpit crew ===
The flight was crewed by 43-year-old Captain Kevin Hunt and 39-year-old First Officer David McClelland. Hunt had been with British Midland since 1966 and had about 13,200 hours of flying experience. First Officer McClelland joined the airline in 1988 and had about 3,300 total flight hours. Between them, the pilots had close to 1,000 hours in the Boeing 737 cockpit (Hunt had 763 hours, and McClelland had 192 hours), but only 76 of these had been in Boeing 737-400 series aircraft (Hunt 23 hours and McClelland 53 hours).

== Accident ==
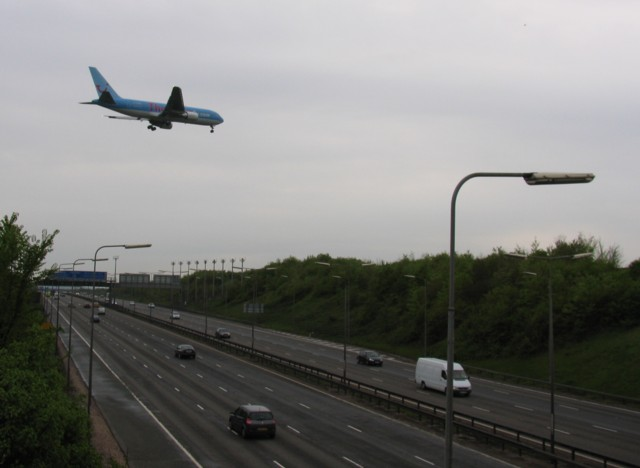
Photograph taken in May 2006, showing the location of the disaster

After taking off from Heathrow at 19:52, (Note: McClelland was the pilot flying until the engine failure, after which Captain Hunt took control.) Flight BD 092 was climbing through 28,300 feet (8,600 m) to reach its cruising altitude of 35,000 feet (11,000 m) when a blade detached from the fan of the port (left) engine. The pilots did not know the source of the problem, but heard a pounding noise, accompanied by severe vibrations. Smoke poured into the cabin through the ventilation system, and passengers became aware of the smell of burning. Several passengers sitting near the rear of the plane noticed smoke and sparks coming from the left engine. The flight was diverted to nearby East Midlands Airport at the suggestion of British Midland Airways Operations.

After the initial blade fracture, Captain Kevin Hunt, the non-handling pilot, took control without first advising McClelland, and disengaged the plane's autopilot. Hunt then asked First Officer David McClelland which engine was malfunctioning, McClelland replied: "It's the le... It's the right one". In previous versions of the 737, the right (number 2) engine supplied air to the flight deck. The pilots had been used to the older version of the aircraft and did not realise that this aircraft was different. The captain later claimed that his perception of smoke as coming forward from the passenger cabin led them to assume the fault was in the right engine. The pilots throttled back the working right engine instead of the malfunctioning left engine. They had no way of visually checking the engines from the cockpit, and the cabin crew – who did not hear the captain refer to the right hand engine in his cabin address – did not inform them that smoke and flames had been seen from the left engine.

When the pilots restarted the right engine, they could no longer smell the smoke or feel the vibration, which led them to believe that they had correctly dealt with the problem. As it turned out, this was due to a combination of the Power Management Control unit and autothrottle which was disengaged prior to shutting down the right engine, the fuel flow to both engines was reduced, and the excess fuel, which had been igniting in the left engine exhaust, disappeared; therefore, the ongoing damage was reduced, the smell of smoke ceased, and the vibration reduced, although it would still have been visible on cockpit instruments which were "at best unclear and at worst misleading" according to Roger Green from the RAF Institute of Air Medicine.

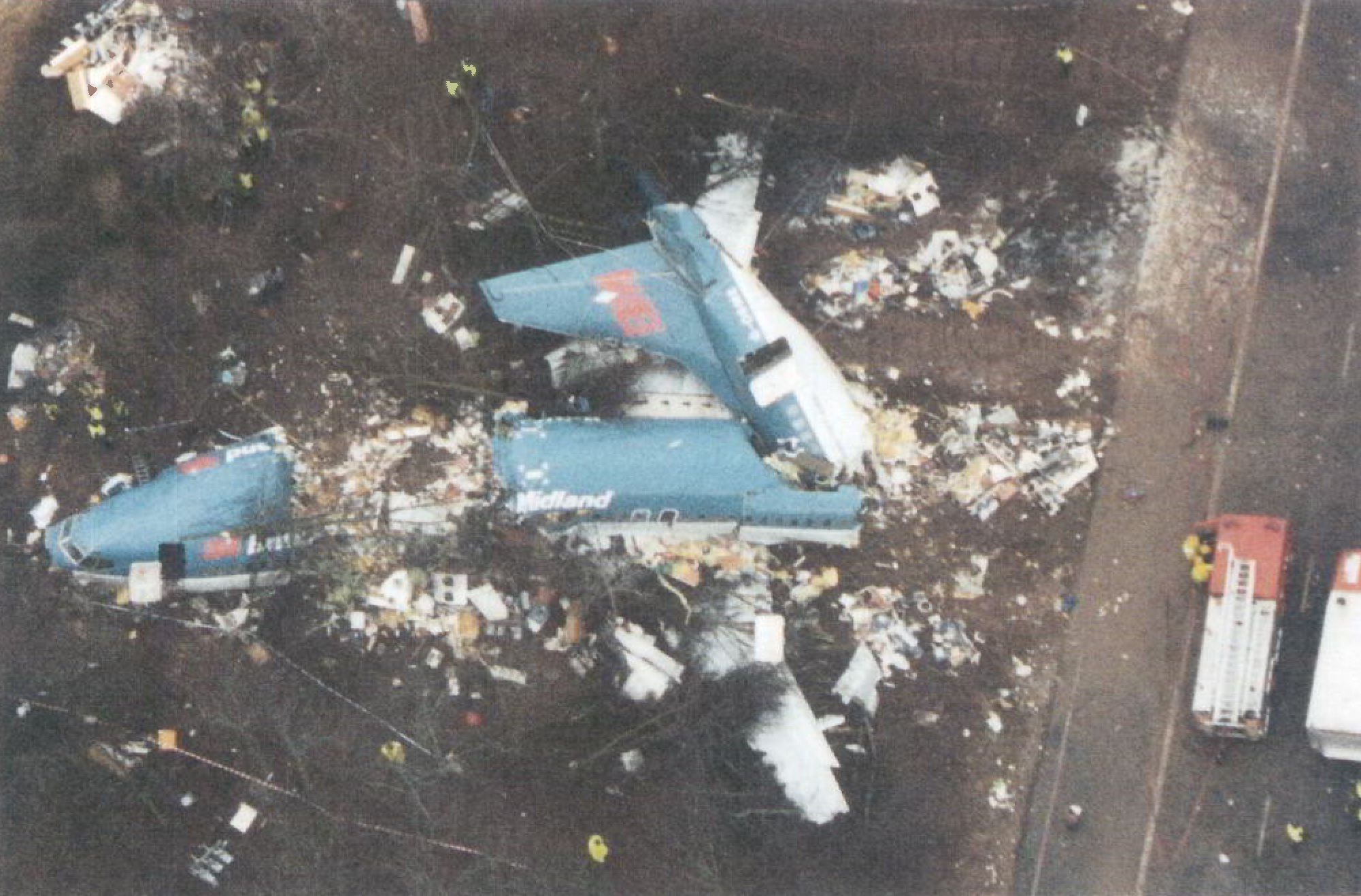
Wreckage of G-OBME

During the final approach to the East Midlands Airport, the pilots selected increased thrust from the operating, damaged engine. This led to an engine fire, caused by the tip of the fan blade dislodging from the cowling, going into the core of the engine and causing it to cease operating entirely. The ground proximity warning system activated, sounding several "glideslope" warnings. The pilots attempted to restart the right engine by windmilling, but the aircraft was by now only 275 metres (900 feet) above the ground and flying too slowly for a restart. At 20:24:33, Captain Hunt broadcast to the passengers via the aircraft's public-address system: "Prepare for crash landing", instructing passengers to take the brace position. The stick shaker then activated. Just before crossing the M1 motorway at 20:24:43, the tail and main landing gear struck the ground at a speed of 213 km/h (115 kn; 132 mph) and the aircraft bounced back into the air and over the motorway, knocking down trees and a lamp post before crashing on the far embankment around 475 metres (519 yd) short of the active runway's paved surface and about 630 metres (690 yd) from its threshold. The aircraft broke into three sections. This was adjacent to the motorway, but no vehicles were travelling on that part of the M1 at the moment of the crash.

== Casualties ==
Of the 118 passengers on board, 39 were killed outright in the crash and 8 died later of their injuries, for a total of 47 fatalities. All eight crew members survived the accident. Of the 79 survivors, 74 suffered serious injuries and 5 suffered minor injuries. In addition, five firefighters also suffered minor injuries during the rescue operation. No one on the motorway was injured, and all vehicles in the vicinity of the disaster were undamaged. The first person to arrive at the scene and render aid was a motorist who helped passengers for over three hours and subsequently received damages for post-traumatic stress disorder. Aid was also given by a troop of eight SAS soldiers - four of whom were regimentally qualified paramedics - who happened to be driving a truck on the M1 a short distance away from the crash site.

== Causes ==
The investigation established that the wiring associated with the fire warning lights was properly connected. Initially there was a concern that the sensors in the engines and the warning lights on the flight deck may have been cross-wired.

=== Shutting down of wrong engine ===
The smell of smoke in the cabin led Captain Hunt to believe that the right engine was malfunctioning, because in earlier Boeing 737 variants, bleed air for cabin air conditioning came from the right engine. Starting with the Boeing 737-400 variant, Boeing had redesigned the system to use bleed air from both engines. Several cabin staff and passengers noticed that the left engine had a stream of unburnt fuel igniting in the jet exhaust, but this information was not passed to the pilots because cabin staff assumed they were aware that the left engine was malfunctioning.

The smell of smoke disappeared when the autothrottle was disengaged and the right engine shut down, because the fuel flow to the damaged left engine decreased as it reverted to manual throttle. In the event of a malfunction, pilots were trained to check all meters and review all decisions, and Captain Hunt proceeded to do so. Whilst he was conducting the review, however, he was interrupted by a transmission from East Midlands Airport informing him he could descend further to 12,000 feet (3,700 m) in preparation for the diverted landing. He did not resume the review after the transmission ended, and instead commenced descent.

The dials on the two vibration gauges (one for each engine) were smaller than on the previous versions of the 737 in which the pilots had the majority of their experience and the LED needle went around the outside of the dial as opposed to the inside. The pilots had received no simulator training on the new model, as no simulator for the 737-400 existed in the UK at that time. At the time, vibration indicators were known for being unreliable (and normally ignored by pilots), but unknown to the pilots, this was one of the first aircraft to have a very accurate vibration readout, although it was still permitted to fly with one gauge unserviceable under Boeing's Minimum Equipment List.

=== Engine malfunction ===
Analysis of the engine from the crash determined that the fan blades (LP stage 1 compressor) of the uprated CFM International CFM56 engine used on the 737-400 were subject to abnormal amounts of vibration when operating at high power settings above 10,000 feet (3,000 m). As it was an upgrade to an existing engine, in-flight testing was not mandatory, and the engine had only been tested in the laboratory. Upon this discovery, the remaining 99 Boeing 737-400s then in service were grounded and the engines modified. Following the crash, testing all newly designed and significantly redesigned turbofan engines under representative flight conditions is now mandatory.

This unnoticed vibration created excessive metal fatigue in the fan blades, and on G-OBME this caused one of the fan blades to break off. This damaged the engine terminally and also upset its delicate balance, causing a reduction in power and an increase in vibration. The autothrottle attempted to compensate for this by increasing the fuel flow to the engine. The damaged engine was unable to burn all the additional fuel, with much of it igniting in the exhaust flow, creating a large trail of flame behind the engine.

== Aftermath ==
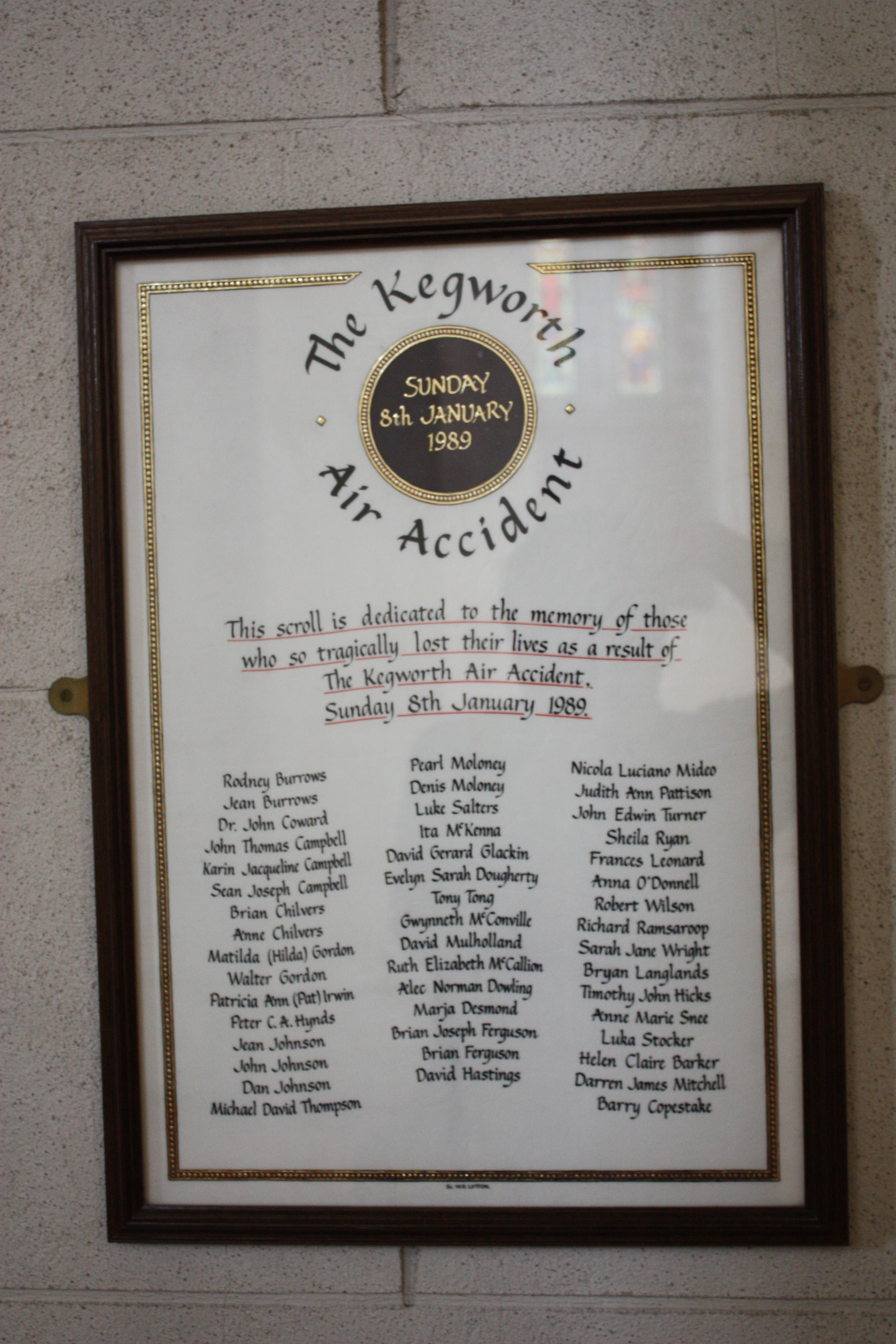
Memorial scroll in St Anne's Cathedral, Belfast

The official report into the disaster made 31 safety recommendations. Evaluation of the injuries sustained led to considerable improvements in aircraft safety and emergency instructions for passengers. These were derived from a research programme funded by the CAA and carried out by teams from the University of Nottingham and Hawtal Whiting Structures (an engineering consultancy company). The study between medical staff and engineers used analytical "occupant kinematics" techniques to assess the effectiveness of the brace position. A new notice to operators revising the brace position was issued in October 1993.

The research into this accident led to the formation on 21 November 2016 of the International Board for Research into Aircraft Crash Events, which is a joint co-operation between experts in the field for the purpose of producing an internationally agreed-upon, evidence-based set of impact bracing positions for passengers and (eventually) cabin crew members in a variety of seating configurations. These will be submitted to the International Civil Aviation Organization through its Cabin Safety Group.

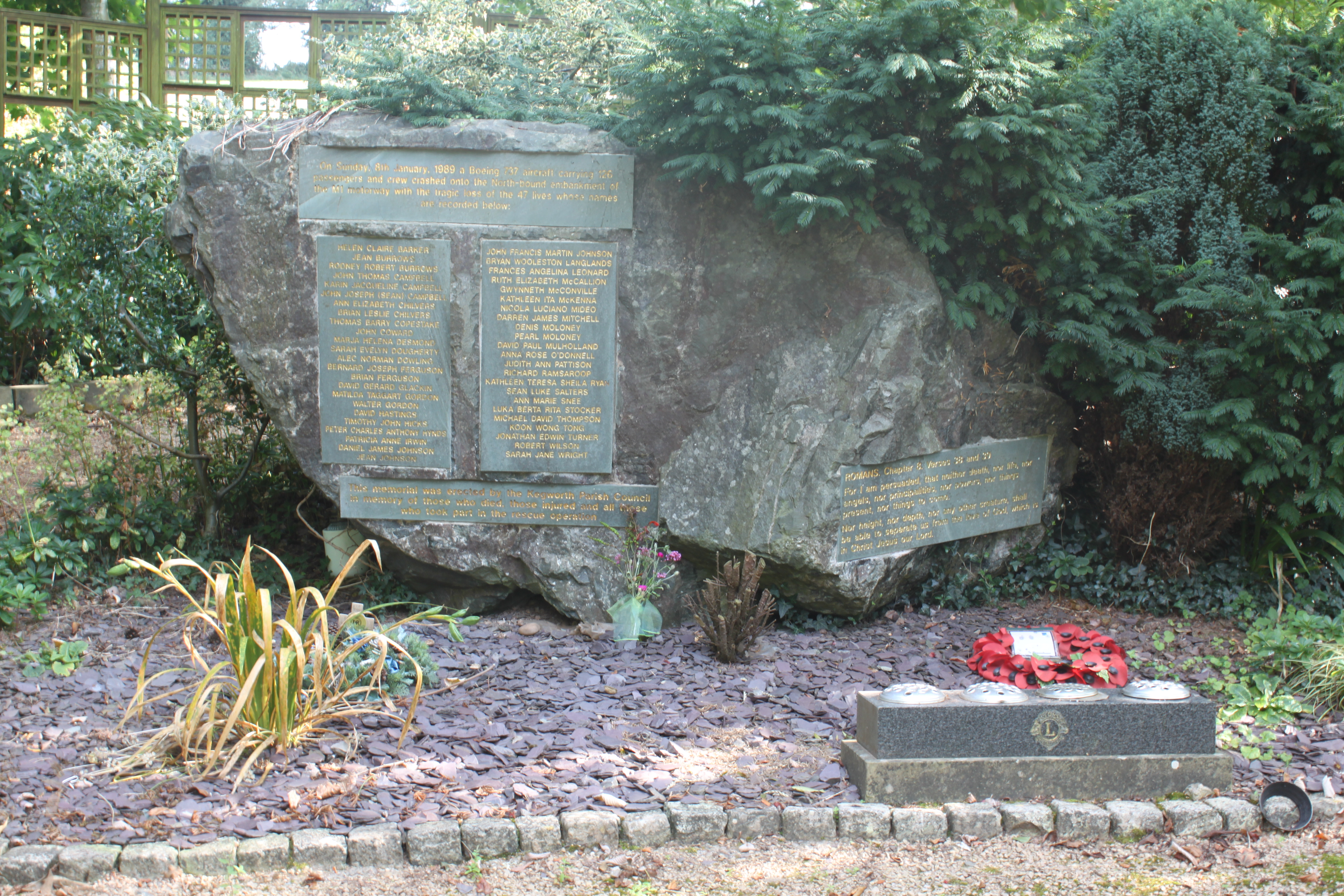
Memorial garden at Kegworth cemetery

A memorial was built in the village cemetery in nearby Kegworth to "those who died, those who were injured and those who took part in the rescue operation", together with a garden made using soil from the crash site.

Captain Hunt and First Officer McClelland, both seriously injured in the crash, were dismissed following the criticisms of their actions in the Air Accidents Investigation Branch report. Hunt suffered injuries to his spine and legs in the crash. In April 1991, he told a BBC documentary, "We were the easy option – the cheap option if you wish. We made a mistake – we both made mistakes – but the question we would like answered is why we made those mistakes." British Midland later paid McClelland an out-of-court settlement for unfair dismissal.

Alan Webb, the chief fire officer at East Midlands Airport, was made an MBE in the 1990 New Year Honours list for the co-ordination of his team in the rescue efforts that followed the crash. Graham Pearson, a passing motorist who assisted Kegworth survivors at the crash site for three hours, sued the airline for post-traumatic stress disorder and was awarded £57,000 in damages in 1998 (equivalent to £106,000 in 2024).

== Media ==
The crash was featured in a 1991 documentary, an episode of the series Taking Liberties named "Fatal Error". it was also featured in an edition of ITV's The Cook Report in 1993 entitled "Don't Shoot the Pilot", ITV aired a documentary in 1999 of the Kegworth crash. Flight 092 was also featured in an episode of Seconds From Disaster called "Motorway Plane Crash".

It was also featured in the 2011 Discovery Channel documentary Aircrash Confidential.

In 2015, the incident was featured in the episode "Choosing Sides" or "M1 Plane Crash" of the documentary television series Mayday, or Air Crash Investigation, as it is known in the UK.

In 2024, the incident was also featured on the "M1 Plane Crash" episode of Terror at 30,000 Feet on Channel 5.

Kegworth: Flight to Disaster was broadcast on BBC Northern Ireland on 8 January 2025, the 36th anniversary of the accident.

== See also ==
- Other cases of misidentification of a failing engine:
  - TransAsia Airways Flight 235
  - South African Airlink Flight 8911
  - Transair Flight 810
  - Azerbaijan Airlines Flight A-56
  - Edinburgh Air Charter Flight 3W
  - 2020 United States Air Force E-11A crash
