= Coastal Air =

Airline of the U.S. Virgin Islands

Coastal Air Transport
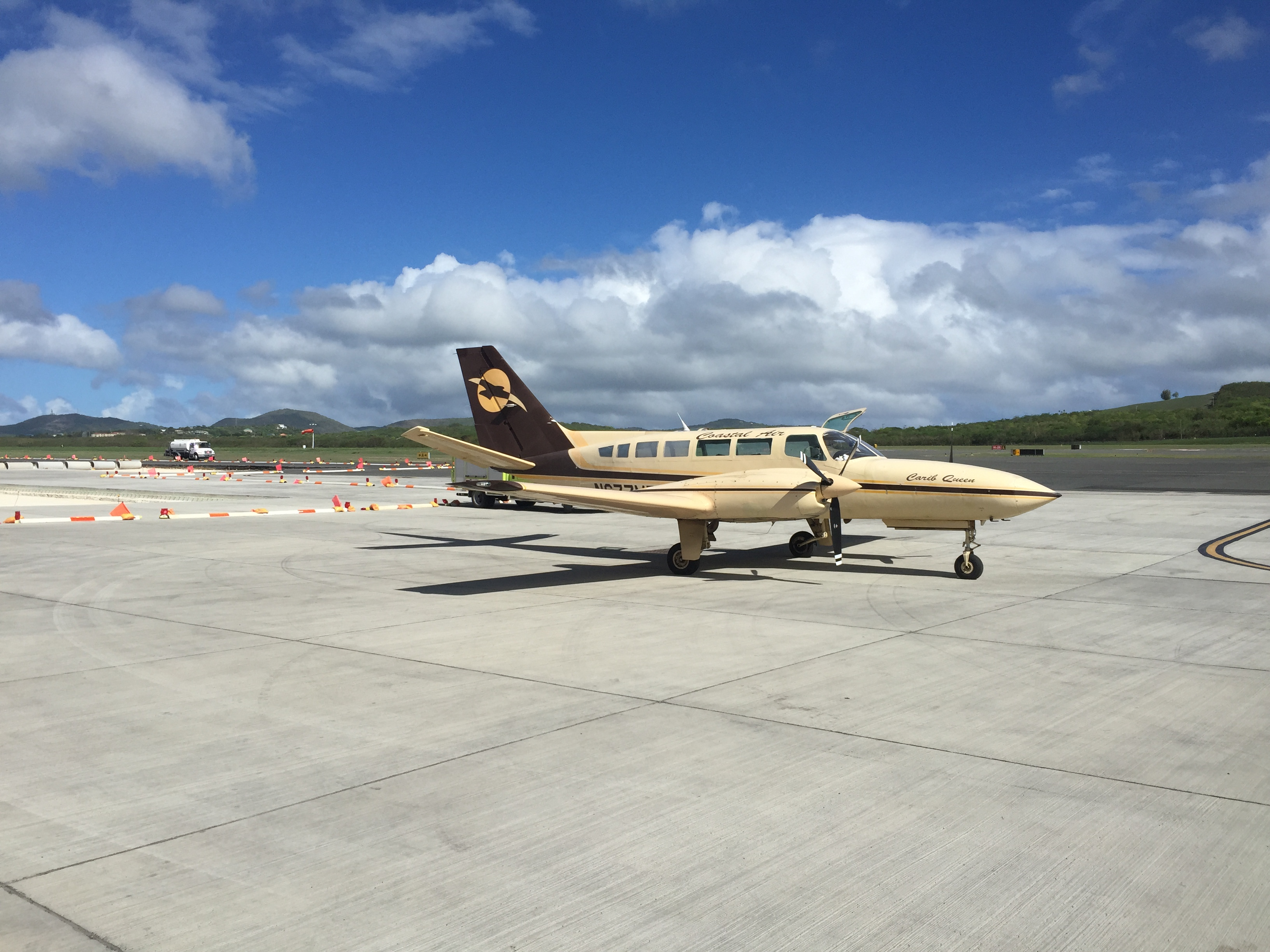
- Coastal Air Cessna 404
IATA	ICAO	Call sign
DQ	TCL	Coastal
- Fleet size: 2
- Destinations: Nevis, St. Eustatius, St. Kitts, Anguilla, Dominica Canefield.
- Headquarters: St. Croix, U.S. Virgin Islands
- Key people: Michael Foster

Founded in 1976 by Michael Foster, Coastal Air Transport is a St. Croix, U.S. Virgin Islands-based airline that provides service to several Caribbean destinations including St. Eustatius, Nevis, Dominica, Anguilla and St. Kitts. Coastal Air operates Cessna 402 and 404 nine passenger airplanes.

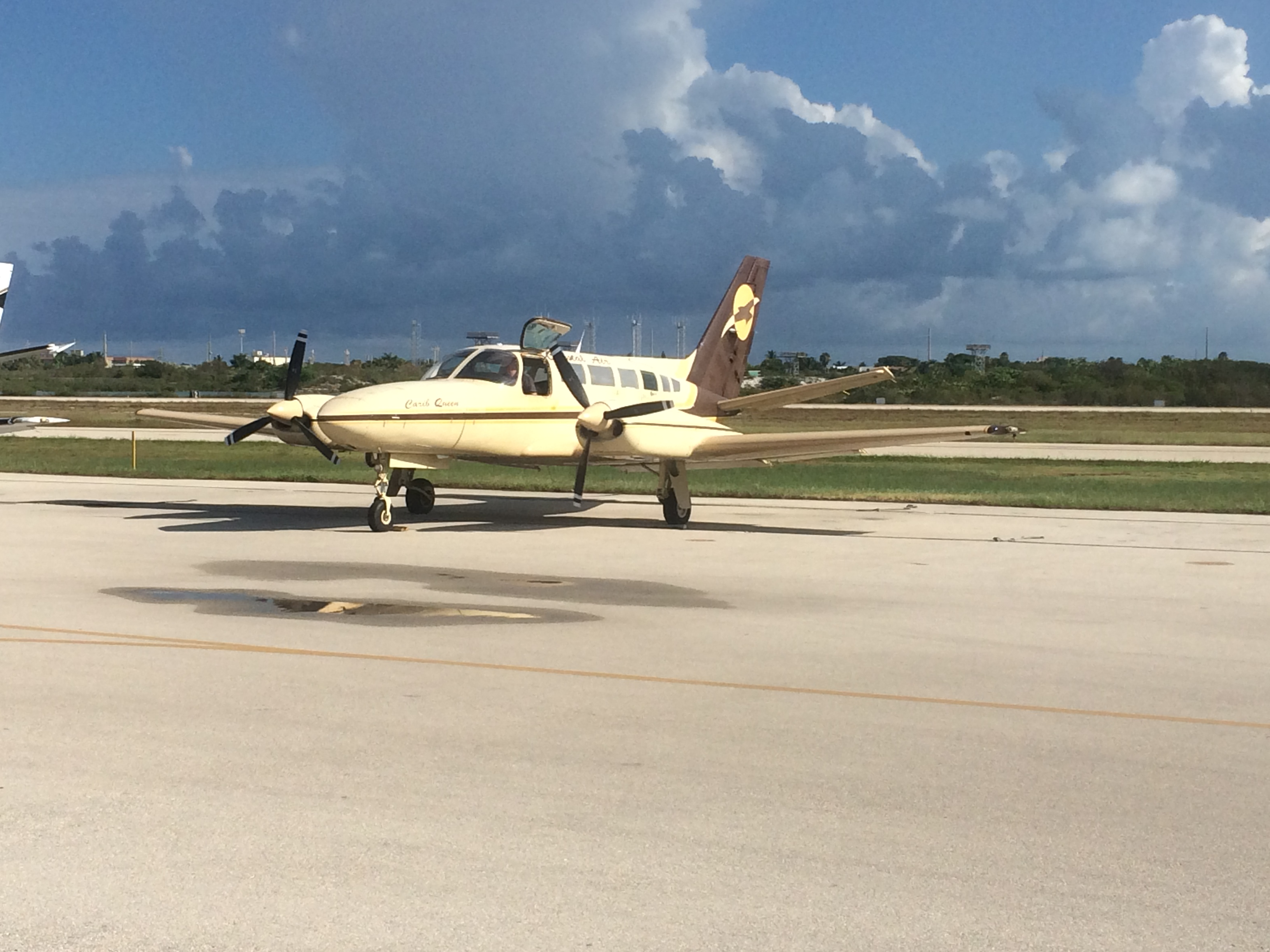
In transit for engine swap in Texas.

== Destinations ==
- Dominica-Canefield
- Anguilla
- Saint Croix
- Nevis
- Saint Kitts
- Sint Eustatius
- Sint Maarten

== Fleet ==
As of February 2019 the Coastal Air fleet includes:

Coastal Air Fleet
Aircraft	In Fleet	Notes
Cessna 404	1	
Cessna 402B	1	
Total	2	
