= Sixty second review =

Technique used by flight attendants

The sixty second review (also known as a silent review or mental review) is a technique used by flight attendants during the critical phases of flight to focus and prepare them for a sudden emergency.

== Use ==
How the silent review is performed varies according to different airlines, but the principles and the desired result are the same throughout. Just prior to take off, and from gear down to landing, flight attendants will be in their jumpseats in a semi-brace position performing their silent review. This can either be a structured set of questions that they mentally go over, or a series of suggested questions that the attendant can think about as they observe the cabin.

Structured silent reviews typically use mnemonics, one such being "OLDABC":

- Operation of exits
- Location of emergency equipment
- Drills (brace for impact)
- Able bodied passengers, selected and used by flight attendants to assist in an evacuation, typically by remaining at the bottom of the escape slide.
- Brace position
- Commands (such as "heads down – stay down", "undo seatbelts and come this way")
