= Trans Executive Airlines =

American airline company

TransAir
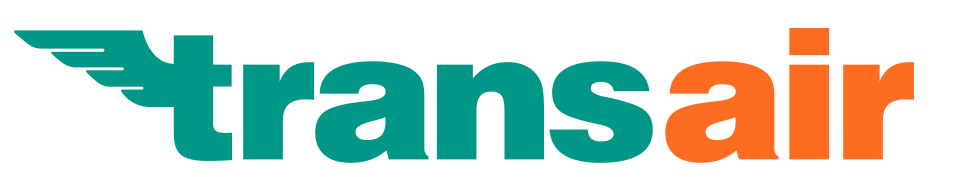

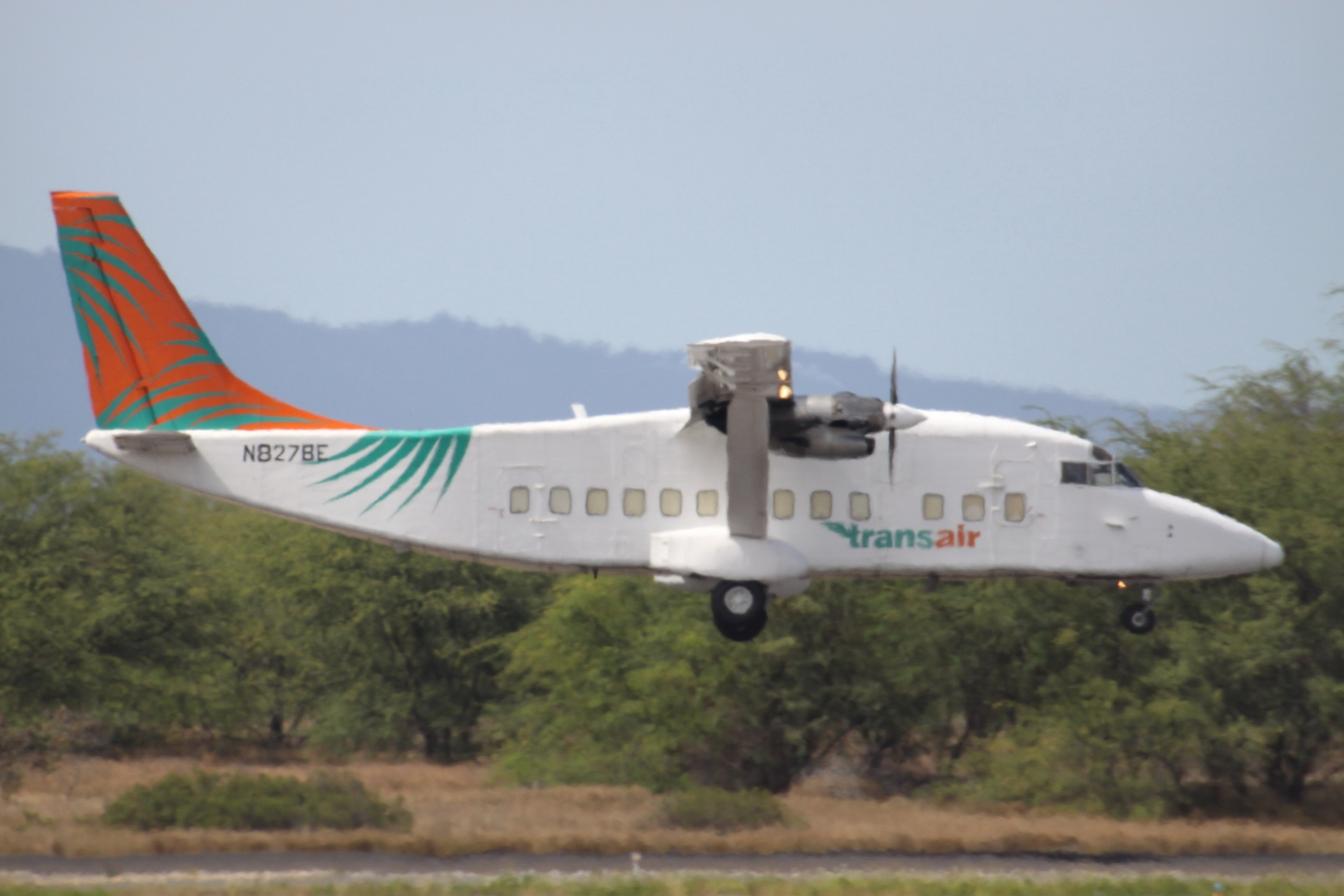
IATA	ICAO	Call sign
R9	MUI	RHOADES EXPRESS
- Founded: 1982
- AOC #: JRAA169N
- Hubs: Daniel K. Inouye international Airport
- Fleet size: 10
- Destinations: 8
- Headquarters: Honolulu, Hawaii, United States
- Key people: Teimour Riahi
- Website: transairhawaii.com

Trans Executive Airlines of Hawaii is an American airline headquartered at Daniel K. Inouye International Airport in Honolulu, Hawaii, operating cargo flights under the name Transair and passenger air charter and tour flights under the name Transair Global. The airline was started in 1982 by Teimour Riahi. As of 2019, the airline operated a fleet of six Boeing 737-200 (five cargo configuration, one VIP passenger configuration) and four Short 360 aircraft.

According to the airline's website, "The all-cargo B-737 aircraft are operated by Rhoades Aviation, Inc. d.b.a. Transair, and the all-cargo SD3-60-300 are operated by Trans Executive Airlines of Hawaii, Inc. d.b.a. Transair Express."

On July 2, 2021, after but unrelated to the Flight 810 incident, the Rhoades Aviation Inc. division was grounded by the Federal Aviation Administration (FAA) due to maintenance and safety deficiencies. This idled their one remaining operational 737-200 jet, but did not affect operations of the Transair Express turboprops. On May 25, 2022, citing numerous safety violations found during its investigation of Flight 810, the FAA announced that it was revoking Rhoades' air operator's certificate. Among the cited violations were 33 flights undertaken with engines that were not airworthy. Rhoades was given until June 8 to appeal the agency's decision. On April 8, 2025, Rhoades Aviation, Inc.(RAI) dba Transair, issued a press release stating " Rhoades Aviation, Inc dba Transair looks to resume inter-island air cargo service as soon as late 2025. This resumption is possible, pending regulatory approvals, after an Administrative Law Judge of the National Transportation Safety Board (NTSB) ruled in favor of Rhoades Aviation and dismissed with prejudice the Federal Aviation Administration (FAA)'s attempt to revoke Rhoades Aviation's operating certificate. The NTSB Judge also directed, and the FAA and RAI have agreed, that Rhoades Aviation and the FAA will work together on RAI's efforts to resume its cargo air transportation services.

== Destinations ==
- Hilo (Hilo International Airport)
- Honolulu (Daniel K. Inouye International Airport), hub
- Kahului (Kahului Airport)
- Kona (Kona International Airport)
- Lihue (Lihue Airport)
- Kamuela, Hawaii (Waimea-Kohala Airport)
- Molokai (Molokai Airport)
- Lanai (Lanai Airport)

== Fleet ==
TransAir fleet
Aircraft	In service	Notes
Boeing 737-200C	6	One as a VIP passenger
Short 360	4	One operating with “Interisland Airways” livery

== Incidents ==
In the early morning hours of July 2, 2021, Transair Flight 810, a Boeing 737-200 cargo aircraft, experienced an engine failure shortly after taking off from Honolulu's Daniel K. Inouye International Airport en route to the neighboring Hawaiian island of Maui. The crew were attempting to return to Honolulu when the plane's other engine overheated, forcing them to ditch about 4 miles (6.4 km) south of Oahu. Both pilots were rescued by the United States Coast Guard. The U.S. National Transportation Safety Board initiated actions to conduct an accident investigation. The NTSB final report, DCA21FA174, determined probable cause(s) of the accident to be: The flight crewmembers' misidentification of the damaged engine(after leveling the airplane and reducing thrust) and their use of only the damaged engine during the remainder of the flight, resulting in an unintentional descent and forced ditching in the Pacific Ocean. Contributing to the accident was the flight crew's ineffective crew resource management, high workload and stress. The final report also states that "maintenance was not a factor in the accident".

On July 16, the FAA revoked the maintenance inspection authority of Rhoades Aviation, the certificate holder that operates the 737-200 aircraft, based on findings from an ongoing investigation of its operation that began in 2020. The revocation was later dismissed, with prejudice, by the NTSB Administrative Law Judge on November, 27, 2024.

On January 29, 1996, at 04:35 Hawaiian standard time, a Cessna 402B registered as N999CR, collided with gradually rising terrain while on takeoff from the Waimea-Kohala Airport in Kamuela, Hawaii. The aircraft was destroyed. The certificated airline transport pilot sustained fatal injuries, and two onboard cargo loaders received serious injuries. The aircraft was being operated as a contract mail flight by Trans Executive Airlines of Hawaii under 14 CFR Part 135 when the accident occurred. The flight originated in Honolulu, Hawaii, at 0200. The flight departed Kamuela on the return leg of the flight at 0430.

== See also ==
- List of airlines in Hawaii
