= International Board for Research into Aircraft Crash Events =

Aviation experts' org

The International Board for Research into Aircraft Crash Events (IBRACE) was founded on 21 November 2016 by a group of subject-matter experts in aviation (cabin safety and accident/incident investigation), engineering (sled-impact testing, aerospace materials, lightweight advanced-composite structures, and air transport safety and investigation), clinical medicine (specifically, orthopaedic trauma surgery and anaesthesia), and human factors. These experts are associated with organizations that include the Civil Aerospace Medical Institute, USA (CAMI); Cranfield University, England; GRM Consulting Ltd., England; Spire Liverpool Hospital, England; TÜV Rheinland, Germany; the University of Calgary, Canada; the University of Nottingham, England; and Wonkwang University, Korea.

IBRACE is a joint cooperation between these experts for the purpose of producing an internationally agreed, evidence-based set of impact bracing positions for passengers in a variety of seating configurations, which will be submitted to the International Civil Aviation Organization (ICAO) through its Cabin Safety Group (ICSG).

== Background ==
In the early 1990s, following the UK Kegworth air disaster (8 January 1989 ), a research project was undertaken by a group of surgeons, air accident investigators and pathologists to analyse the injury profile of the passengers and crew on board the aircraft. This project led to the first research-based definition of the passenger's brace position.

In 2007, the German Federal Ministry of Transport, Building and Urban Affairs recommended a brace position for forward-facing passenger seats, which differed from other contemporary research-based recommendations: this was based on a dummy test run first reported in 1995.

In 2010, two international aviation transportation agencies issued a number of recommendations of different passenger brace positions. These agencies were Transport Canada, in its Advisory Circular on Passenger and Flight Attendant Brace Positions (2010), and the US Department of Transportation, Federal Aviation Administration FAA, in its Advisory Circular on Passenger Safety Information Briefing and Briefing Cards (2010).

In 2015, the Office of Aerospace Medicine, Department of Transport, FAA, released the results of its own study, Effect of Passenger Position on Crash Injury Risk in Transport-Category Aircraft. As with the German Federal Ministry of Transport, Building and Urban Affairs report, this latest FAA study differed in some important respects from other research-based recommendations.

In 2015, the International Civil Aviation Organization (ICAO) began to develop guidance material on information and instructions for passenger safety, which includes a review of brace positions. This review was carried out with the goal of developing internationally harmonised recommendations on the subject, including instructions for Civil Aviation Authorities on the passenger and cabin crew brace positions. At its April 2016 meeting, the ICSG heard from subject-matter experts on the passenger and cabin crew brace positions from Germany, the United Kingdom and the United States, as well as from a cabin-safety expert from Korea and a human-factors and evidence-based medicine expert from Canada.

An ad hoc group of the ICSG was formed and committee members met through a series of telephone consultations. Certain common elements of a safe brace position for forwards-facing passenger seats in Economy class were identified and discussed. On 26 September 2016, the ad hoc group became the Brace Position Sub-Group of the ICAO Cabin Safety Group (ICSG).

Continuing review of the evidence and further discussions led the ICSG Sub-Group to determine that there was no single, completely evidence-based and internationally agreed passenger brace position to reduce an aircraft occupant’s risk of injury during an aircraft crash sequence. However, because of the lack of agreement on the best evidence, the ICSG Sub-Group was unable to recommend to the ICSG one single brace position for passengers seated in forward-facing Economy class seats.

The ICSG Sub-Group continued to meet by telephone until 21 November 2016, when an in-person and web-based meeting was held in England, at the Royal College of Physicians, London. One of the goals of the meeting was to determine how to plan and undertake further research in order to produce the necessary evidence upon which recommendations about the brace position could be based. Because of the need to raise funds to support the research, a decision was made to transform the ICSG Sub-Group into a body independent of the ICAO, and this led to the formation of IBRACE.
