= Māmala Bay =

Bay on the island of Oahu, Hawaii

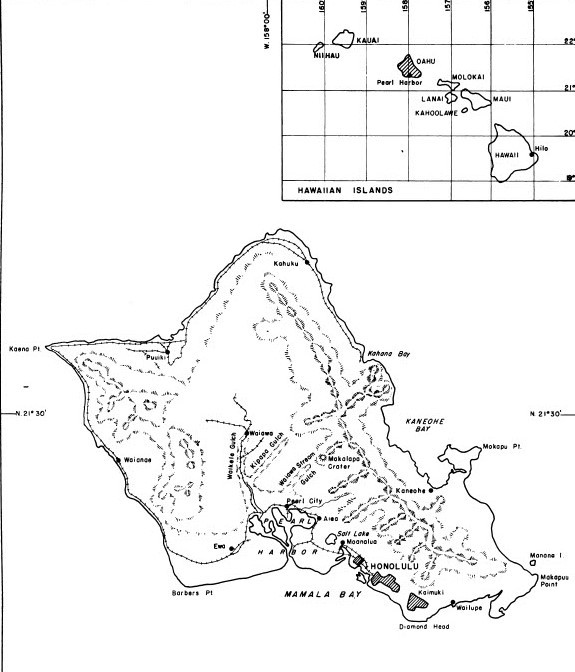
- Map of Oahu displaying Māmala Bay

- Location within Hawaii
- Location: Oahu, Hawaii
- Coordinates: 21.3°N 157.9°W
- Type: Bay
- Primary inflows: Pearl Harbor, Honolulu Harbor
- Primary outflows: Pacific Ocean
- Surface elevation: 0 feet (0 m)

Māmala Bay or Mamala Bay is the near-shore area of the Pacific Ocean between Barbers Point and Diamond Head on the island of Oahu in Hawaii. The entrance to Pearl Harbor and Honolulu Harbor are in Māmala Bay. Transair Flight 810 made an emergency ditching in the bay on July 2, 2021.
