= Brace position =

Position assumed to increase safety in a crash

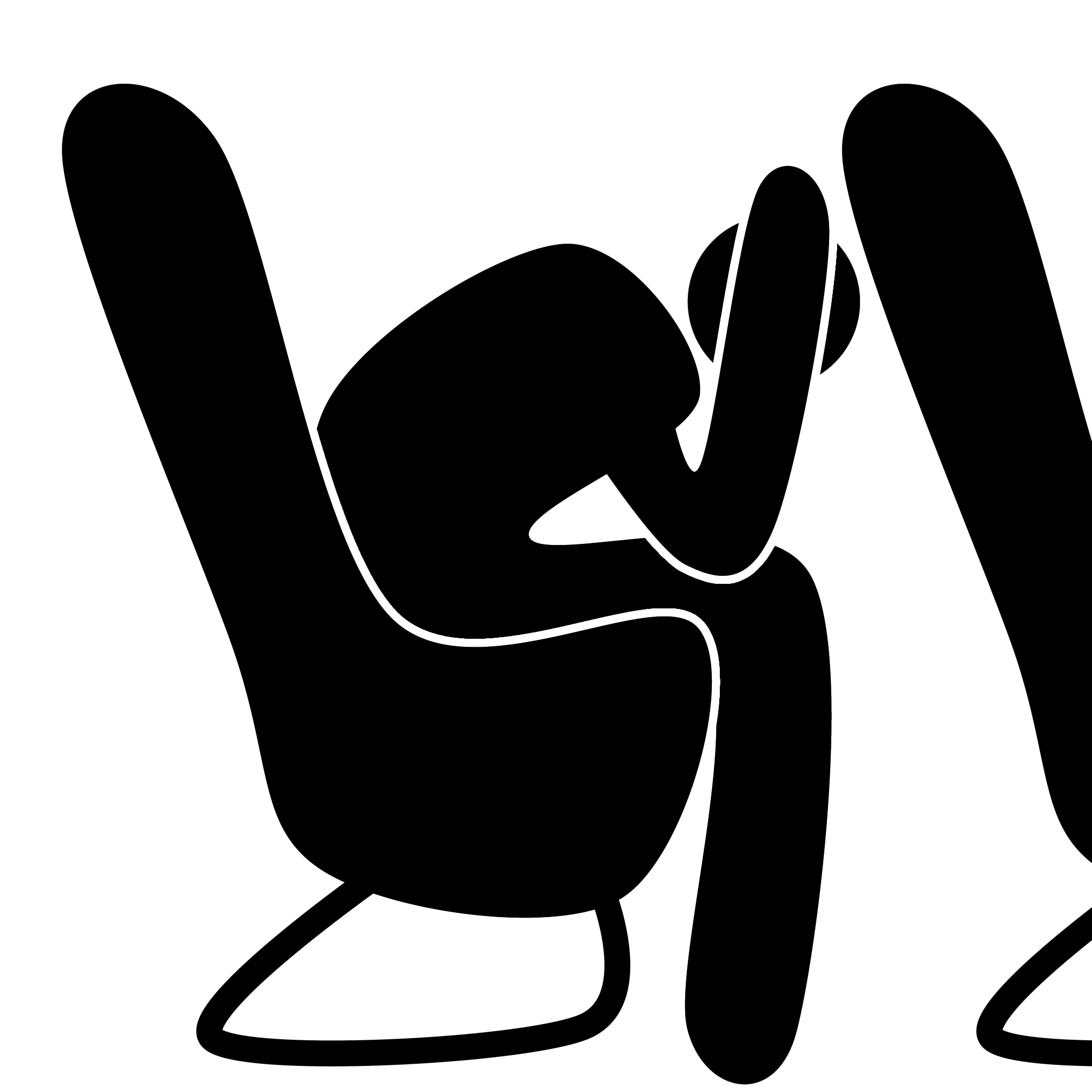
Depiction of how to assume brace position

To assume a brace position or crash position is an instruction that can be given to prepare for a crash, such as on an aircraft; the instruction to "Brace for impact!" or "Brace! Brace!" is often given if the aircraft must make an emergency landing on land or water. There are many different ways to adopt the brace position, with many countries adopting their own version based on research performed by their own aviation authority or that of other countries. The most common in passenger airliners being the forward-facing seat version, in which the person bracing places their head against or as close as possible to the surface it is likely to strike (and in the process bending over to some degree), placing their feet firmly on the floor, and their hands either on their head or the seat in front.

== Types of brace position ==
There are many different ways to adopt the brace position, with many countries adopting their own version based on research performed by their own aviation authority or that of other countries. There is commonality among all brace positions despite these variations.

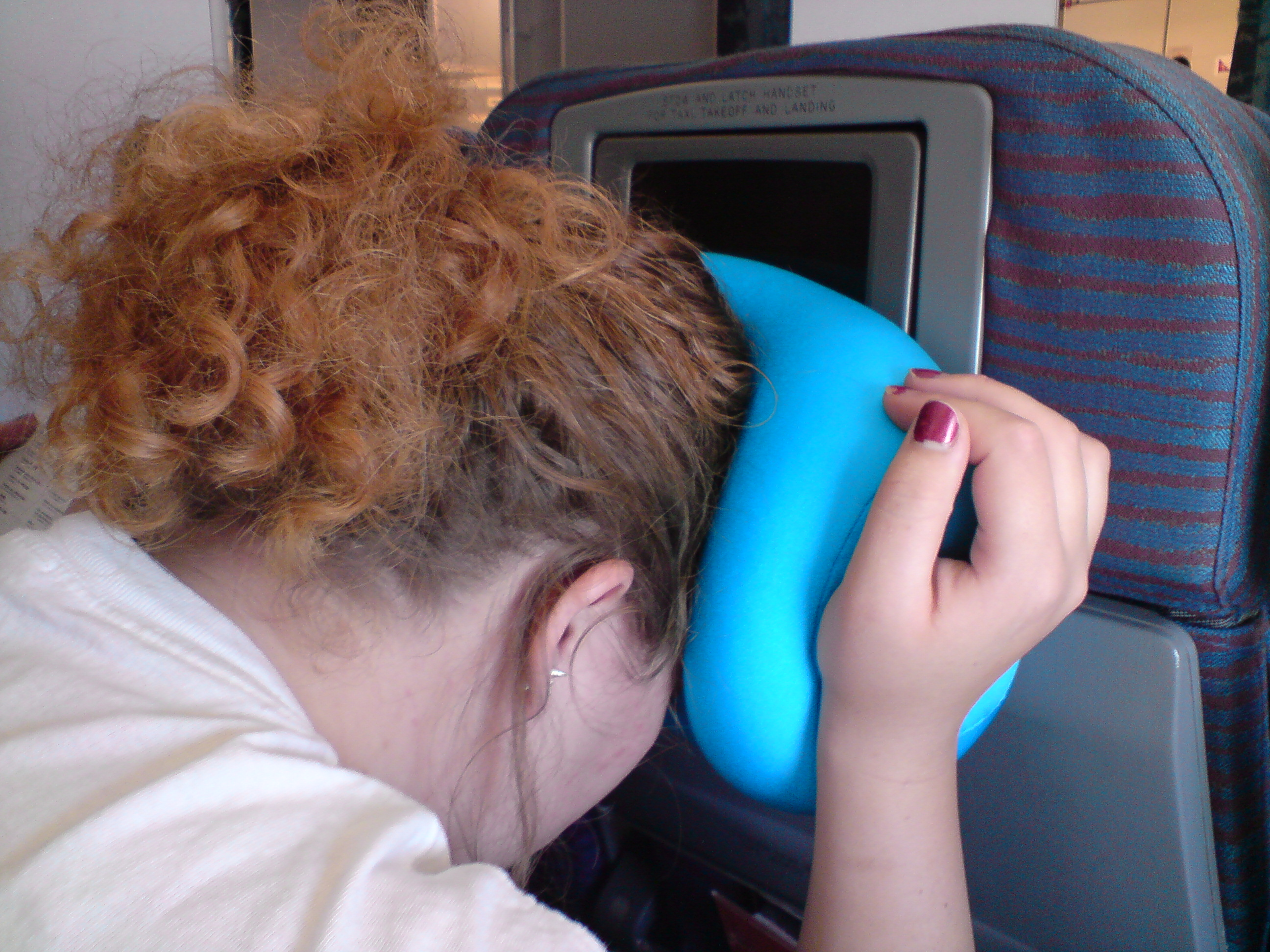
Woman demonstrating the "forward-facing seat" brace position by cradling the head on the seat in front.

=== Forward-facing seat ===
For a forward seated passenger wearing only a lap belt, common recommendations for the brace position include:

- Place head on, or as close as possible to, the surface it is most likely to strike. (For example, the bulkhead or seat in front.)
- Bend forward at the waist to some degree to avoid jackknifing or submarining (sliding) forward in the seat and out from under the belt.
- Place both feet on the floor, either flat or on the balls of the feet.

In the United Kingdom, the brace-for-impact position for forward-facing passengers was optimised following the Kegworth air disaster in 1989. In that incident, the pilot announced "Prepare for crash landing" 10 seconds before impact, and the resulting injuries – from both those who did and did not adopt the brace position – were later studied. The UK Civil Aviation Authority funded an engineering–medical joint research team, led by Nigel Rock of Hawtal Whiting Engineering Consultants and Prof. Angus Wallace of the Nottingham University Hospital and aided by Wing Commander David Anton of the Royal Air Force Institute of Aviation Medicine. Crash data was supplemented by medical information from the University of Nottingham and testing at the Institute of Aviation Medicine. The work used mathematical modelling derived from the automobile industry to analyse the human body under crash conditions. (See "Further reading" below.)

This work led to the formation of the International Board for Research into Aircraft Crash Events (IBRACE) on 21 November 2016.

The brace position as set out to airlines in the UK for passengers in forward-facing seats is based on extensive analytical work arising from Kegworth. It is subtly different from that in the United States and some other countries. Passengers should place their feet and knees together with their feet firmly on the floor (either flat or on the balls of their feet) and tucked behind the knees to prevent shins and legs from being broken against the base of the seat in front. They should bend as far forward as possible, resting their head against the seat in front if it is within reach and place their hands on the back of their head, with the hands one on top of another (rather than interlocked). Their elbows should then be brought in. This prevents both flailing of the arms in the crash sequence and protects the head from flying debris. The head should be as far below the top of the seats as possible to prevent injury from any collapsing overhead compartments.

The brace procedure for the forward-facing seat in the United States is similar to that of the UK, but rather than placing the hands on the back of the head, passengers are advised to place them on the top of the seat in front, one hand holding the other wrist and resting the head in the space between the arms. If the seat in front is not within reach then passengers are advised to either grab their ankles or place their hands under their legs and grab the opposite forearm.

=== Jumpseats ===
Flight attendant brace positions are somewhat different due to the design of aircraft jumpseats. So far, there has been little research into the best brace position for flight attendants, though airlines have adopted positions that are very similar to one another.

In rear-facing seats, the attendants should be sitting with their back and head firmly against the back of the jumpseat, their knees and feet together and slightly in front of or behind the knee (depending on the individual airline's procedures) – commonly referred to as "toes to tail". In European carriers, the hands can be placed behind the head and hands one on top of the other and the elbows brought in to meet, taking care that the forearm does not cover the ear and restrict hearing. This position provides the flight attendants protection to the face from any flying debris (as it will impact their elbows) yet still provides them with the ability to view the cabin and not muffle their commands. In the United States, the Federal Aviation Administration (FAA) does not recommend placing the hands behind the neck as their research suggests such actions can cause unnecessary loading on the neck and spine during an impact. Instead, US flight attendants are typically taught to sit on their hands, palms facing the ceiling, underneath their upper legs. Other variations include clasping the hands on the knees or using one arm to "hug" the opposing arm.

For forward-facing jumpseats, the position is the same but with the feet behind the knees. Some airlines also require flight attendants to tuck their chin in to their chest ("Bow to the captain") to reduce the likelihood of whiplash injuries.

There is also a third brace position for flight attendants, the "normal" or "semi" brace position. This is adopted by the attendant for every take-off and landing; it provides them with protection from any sudden emergencies and allows them to adopt the full brace position quickly should they need to. The only difference between the normal brace and the full brace position is that the attendants will either fold their arms across their stomach or immobilize them by placing their hands under their thighs with the palms up. This position forms part of every flight attendant's sixty second review – a technique adopted by airlines whereby the attendant will go over various factors in their head during the take-off and landing sequence. Things such as "How do I open my door?", "Where is the next nearest exit?", "Am I over land or water?" and "what commands will I shout" are just a few of the questions an attendant will ask themselves. The belief is that this mental review focuses the attendant on the safety-critical role they have during take-off and landing and will result in faster decision-making and adaptation to the scenario.

Newer brace positions are being adopted by many U.S. airlines in which the flight attendants do not sit on their hands. Instead, they place their hands flat on top of their thighs. This new position is being adopted because in the event of a crash, sitting on hands can cause injury and/or crushing.

=== Infants ===
If carrying an infant on a lap, it is generally recommended that above positions should be adopted as well as possible, cradling the child with one arm and using this to also protect the child's head. In the UK, lap children are instructed to wear an infant safety belt which is a separate seat belt with a loop that connects to the parent's belt; however, in the United States such belts are not permitted by FAA regulations. The FAA believes that such baby belts significantly increase the risk of injury to the child. In the early era of commercial aviation, the recommended brace position for children was on the floor against a bulkhead; this has since been amended due to the position's lack of protection. The safest position for an infant is in an aviation-certified child safety seat.

== Instruction ==
=== Routine instruction ===
Many government aviation administrations or regulatory bodies mandate the depiction of how to adopt the brace position on aircraft safety cards and in-flight safety demonstrations. Examples are a 1993 ruling by the United Kingdom Civil Aviation Authority (issued in a Notice to Air Operator Certificate Holders 1993) and CAO 020.11 (section 14.1.3) issued by the Civil Aviation Safety Authority of Australia. The FAA has not required this instruction on flights to, from, or within the United States.

The depiction of how to adopt the brace position is not a basic standard set forth by the International Civil Aviation Organization.

== Successful use ==
A 2015 study by the Federal Aviation Administration has concluded that brace positions, particularly the forward-facing seat position, significantly reduce the risk of head and neck injuries in impacts. When Scandinavian Airlines Flight 751 crashed in 1991, all passengers aboard survived; a "significant factor" to this outcome was the passengers' universal adoption of the brace position. During the "Miracle on the Hudson" emergency water landing of US Airways Flight 1549 in 2009, the pilot warned "Brace for impact" and flight attendants chanted "Brace! Brace! Brace! Heads down! Stay down!" All 155 people on board survived with no life-threatening injuries. In a press interview, one of the surviving crew members of the LaMia Flight 2933 crash in 2016 said that he had survived because he followed the emergency protocols by putting his carry-on suitcase between his legs and sitting in the brace position.

== Conspiracy theories ==
Conspiracy theories and urban legends spread through the internet since the 2000s suggest that the brace position is ineffective at stopping injuries or deaths, and that the actual intention behind its adoption is to kill passengers in crashes, either to ensure a painless death, preserve their remains, or to avoid lawsuits against the airline. Such claims have been debunked by the MythBusters, by fact-checking website Snopes and by aviation professionals.
