= Cessna 404 Titan =

American light twin-engine aircraft

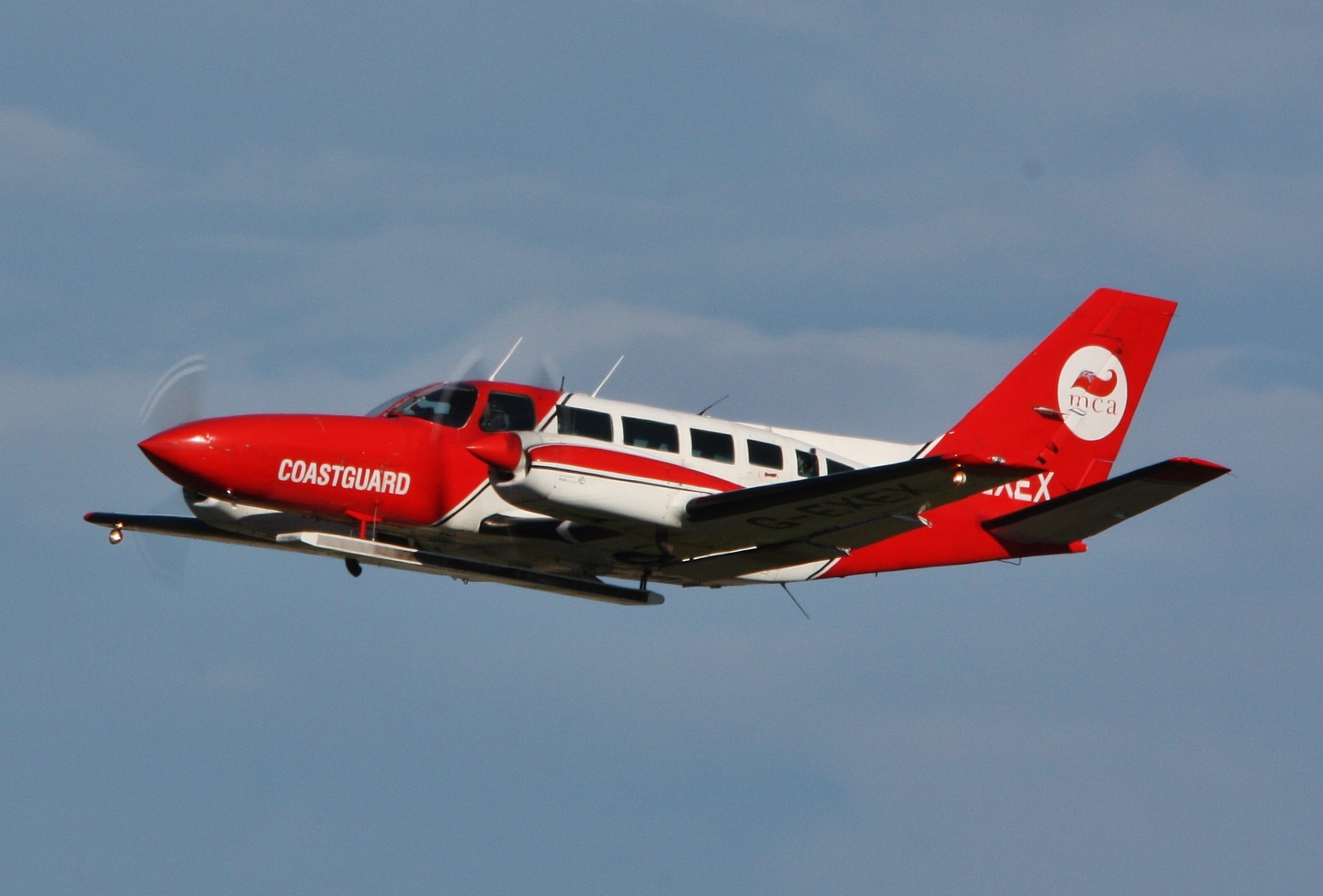

General information
- Type: Light passenger/cargo aircraft
- National origin: United States
- Manufacturer: Cessna
- Number built: 396

History
- Manufactured: 1976–1982
- Introduction date: 1976
- First flight: February 26, 1975
- Developed from: Cessna 402
- Developed into: Reims-Cessna F406 Caravan II; Cessna 441 Conquest II

The Cessna 404 Titan is an American twin-engined, light aircraft built by Cessna Aircraft. It was the company's largest twin piston-engined aircraft at the time of its development in the 1970s. Its US military designation is C-28, and Swedish Air Force designation Tp 87.

== Design and development ==
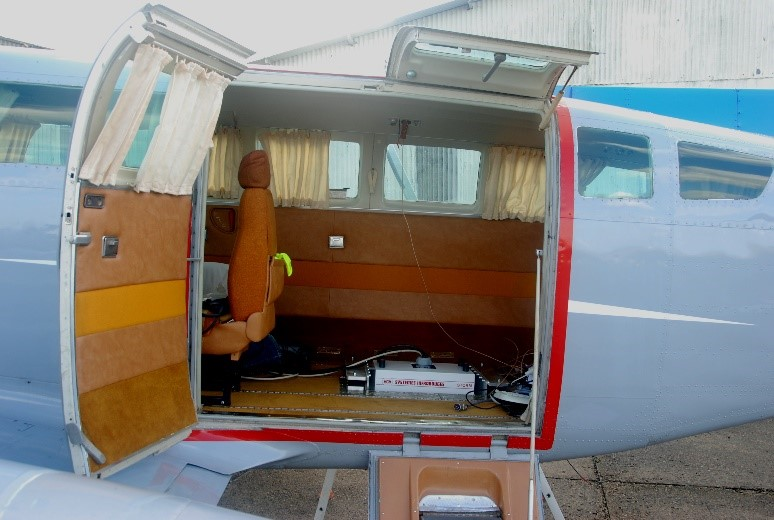
The aft doors on the left side

The Cessna 404 was a development of the Cessna 402 with an enlarged vertical tail and other changes. The prototype first flew on February 26, 1975. It is powered by two 375 hp/280 kW turbocharged Continental Motors GTSIO-520 piston engines. Two versions were offered originally; the Titan Ambassador passenger aircraft for ten passengers, and the Titan Courier utility aircraft for passengers or cargo. By early 1982 seven different variants were available, including a pure cargo version, the Titan Freighter. The Freighter was fitted with a strengthened floor, cargo doors, and its interior walls and ceiling were made from impact-resistant polycarbonate materials to minimize damage in the event of cargo breaking free in-flight.

== Variants ==
- Titan Ambassador – Basic 10-seat passenger aircraft.
- Titan Ambassador II – Ambassador with factory fitted avionics.
- Titan Ambassador III – Ambassador with factory fitted avionics.
- Titan Courier – Convertible passenger/cargo version.
- Titan Courier II – Courier with factory fitted avionics.
- Titan Freighter – Cargo version.
- Titan Freighter II – Freighter with factory fitted avionics.
- C-28A Titan – Designation given to two aircraft purchased by the United States Navy.

== Operators ==
=== Civilian operators ===
Australia

- Hinterland Aviation
- Aero Logistics
- East Coast Airlines
- Par Avion

Comoros

- Int'Air Îles

Tanzania

- ZanAir

United States

- Coastal Air
- Flint Air Service

United Kingdom

- Air UK

=== Military operators ===
Bahamas

- Royal Bahamas Defence Force

Bolivia

- Bolivian Air Force

Colombia

- Colombian Air Force - 2 used by SATENA.

Dominican Republic

- Dominican Republic Air Force

Hong Kong

- Royal Hong Kong Auxiliary Air Force – 1 acquired 1979.

Jamaica

- Jamaica Defence Force

Mexico

- Mexican Navy

Nicaragua

- Nicaraguan Air Force

Sweden

- Swedish Air Force

Tanzania

- Tanzania People's Defence Force

United States

- United States Navy (as the C-28A)

Puerto Rico

- Puerto Rico Police Department Two C404

== Accidents and incidents ==
- On July 21, 1980 a Cessna 404 departing the Grand Canyon Airport for Phoenix, Arizona experienced an engine failure on take-off due to foreign material, improper maintenance, and improper procedures. All eight persons aboard (seven passengers and one crew member) were killed.
- On September 8, 1983 a pair of Cessna 404s operated by Democratic Revolutionary Alliance Contra forces attempted to bomb Managua airport, with one shot down by Sandinista anti-aircraft fire, crashing near the control tower, killing both pilots and an airport worker on the ground, with 40 injured. US Senators Gary Hart and William Cohen both narrowly missed the attack due to a delay in their flight to Managua.
- On June 27, 1989, a Cessna 404 Titan of Formosa Airlines on its way to Wang-an, Penghu crashed into nearby Cianjhen District streets shortly after takeoff. All 12 people on board were killed; there were no ground casualties.
- On January 22, 1992, a Cessna 404 left the runway and hit a hangar killing the sole occupant. At least 4 aircraft were destroyed.
- On May 10, 1996, a Cessna 404 Titan (registred C-FPVB) on an Aerodat charter flight from Pucallpa to Cuzco disappeared. All three passengers were Canadians on an oil exploration trip. No traces of the aircraft were found.
- On September 3, 1999, Edinburgh Air Charter Flight 3W had an engine failure shortly after takeoff, tried to return to Glasgow but crashed short of the runway. 8 of the 11 people on board died. The plane was carrying Airtours employees.
- On December 26, 2002, a Boeing 737 of TAAG Angola Airlines as Flight 572 collided with a Cessna 404 which took off from Windhoek Eros Airport. The people on board the 737 and the sole pilot of the Cessna survived unharmed.

== Specifications (Ambassador I) ==
Data from Jane's All the World's Aircraft 1980–81

General characteristics

- Crew: 2
- Capacity: 6–8 passengers
- Length: 39 ft 6 1/4 in (12.046 m)
- Wingspan: 46 ft 8 1/4 in (14.230 m)
- Height: 13 ft 3 in (4.04 m)
- Wing area: 242.0 sq ft (22.48 m^{2})
- Aspect ratio: 9.0:1
- Empty weight: 4,816 lb (2,185 kg)
- Max takeoff weight: 8,400 lb (3,810 kg)
- Fuel capacity: 340 US gal (280 imp gal; 1,300 L)

Performance

- Maximum speed: 267 mph (430 km/h, 232 kn) at 16,000 ft (4,900 m)
- Cruise speed: 188 mph (302 km/h, 163 kn) (econ cruise) at 20,000 ft (6,100 m)
- Stall speed: 81 mph (130 km/h, 70 kn) flaps down, power off
- Never exceed speed: 274 mph (441 km/h, 238 kn) (Calibrated airspeed)
- Range: 2,120 mi (3,410 km, 1,840 nmi)
- Service ceiling: 26,000 ft (7,900 m)
- Rate of climb: 1,575 ft/min (8.00 m/s)
- Take-off run to 50 ft (15 m): 2,367 ft (721 m)
- Landing run from 50 ft (15 m): 2,130 ft (650 m)

== See also ==
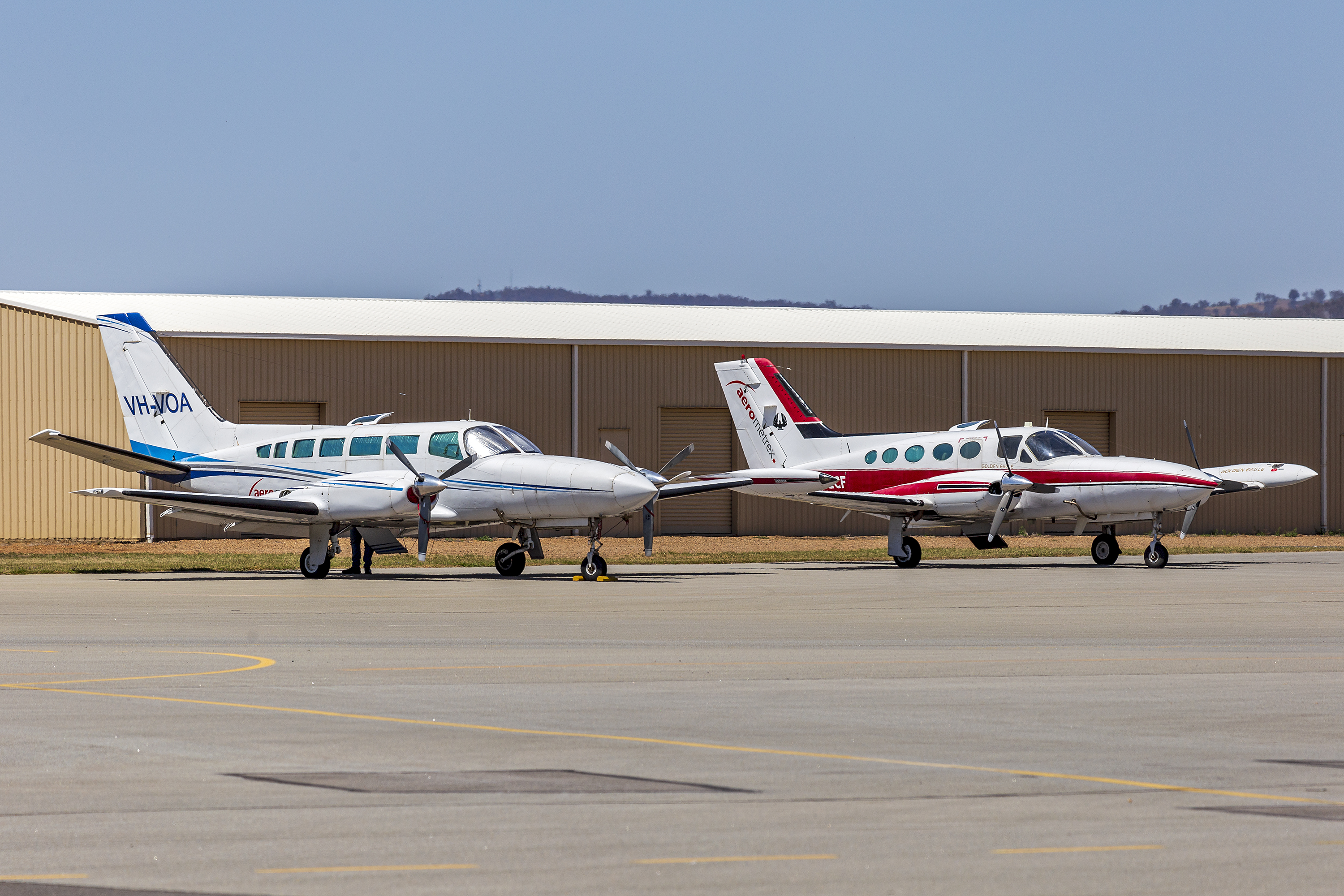
A Cessna 404 Titan (left) with square windows beside a pressurized Cessna 421 (right) with round windows

Related development

- Cessna 441 Conquest II

Aircraft of comparable role, configuration, and era

- Aero Commander 500
- Beechcraft Queen Air
- Britten-Norman BN-2 Islander
- Piper PA-31 Navajo
