= 2020 United States Air Force E-11A crash =

Plane crash in Afghanistan

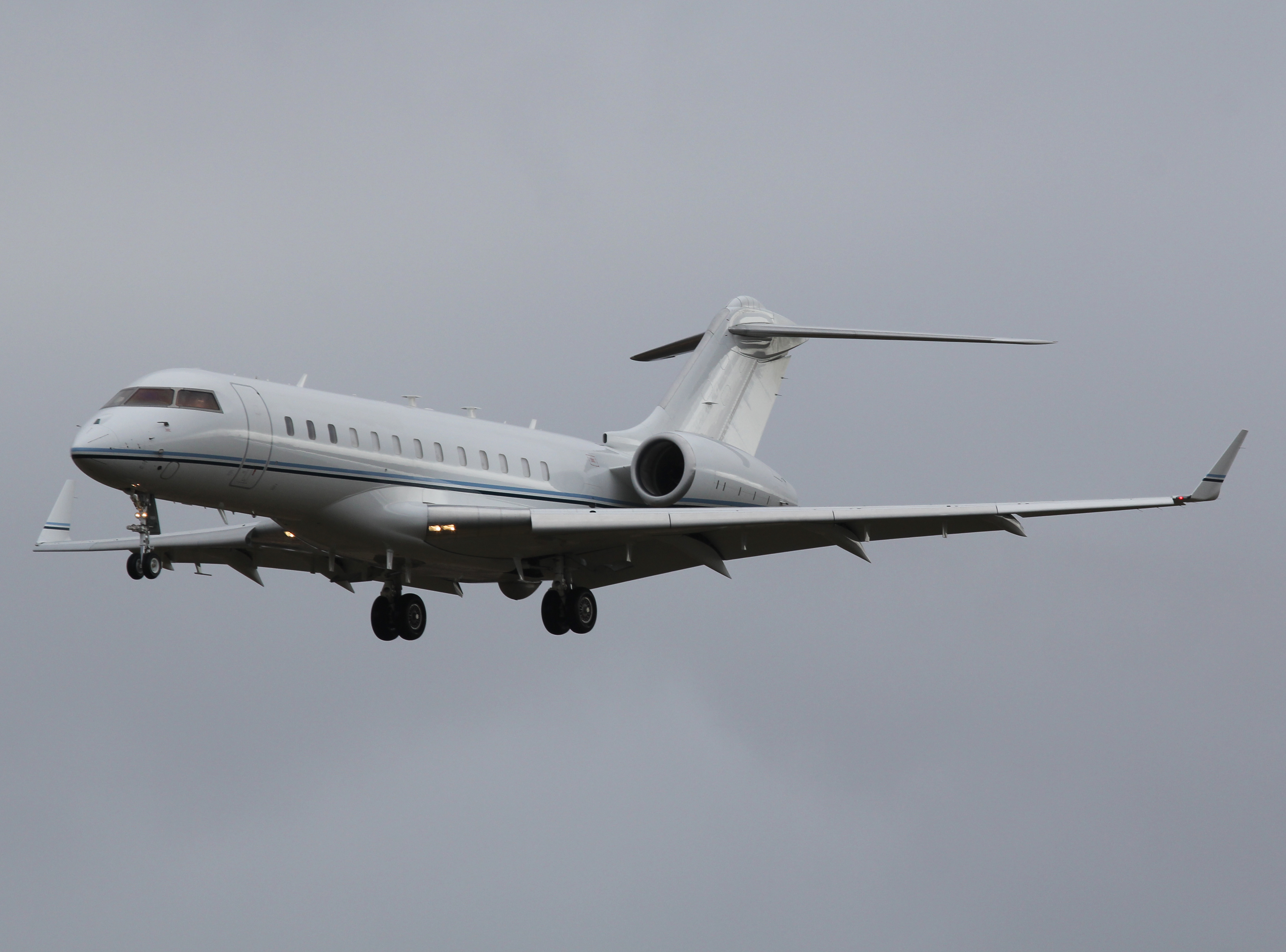
- 11-9358, the aircraft involved in the accident, in 2015.

Accident
- Date: 27 January 2020
- Summary: One engine loss caused by a broken turbine blade; pilot error in subsequent shut-down of the remaining engine
- Site: Dih Yak District, Ghazni Province, Afghanistan

Aircraft
- Aircraft type: Northrop Grumman E-11A (Bombardier Global Express)
- Operator: 430th Expeditionary Electronic Combat Squadron, USAF
- Registration: 11-9358
- Flight origin: Kandahar International Airport
- Destination: Kandahar International Airport
- Occupants: 2
- Passengers: 0
- Crew: 2
- Fatalities: 2
- Survivors: 0

On 27 January 2020, a United States Air Force Bombardier Global Express E-11A aircraft crashed in Afghanistan's Dih Yak District, Ghazni Province. Both crew members on board were killed, according to U.S. military sources. With the complete withdrawal of U.S. forces from Afghanistan in August 2021, this was the last acknowledged U.S. fatal aviation incident of the War in Afghanistan.

== Accident ==
The aircraft crashed at 13:10 local time (08:40 UTC) in the Dih Yak District. Ghazni Province, Afghanistan. The crash site was 130 kilometers (70 nmi) southwest of Kabul, and near the village of Sado Khelo. Voice of America stated that all five people on board were killed. The U.S. Department of Defense only confirmed two fatalities recovered at the crash site.

It was originally reported to be an aircraft of Ariana Afghan Airlines, but the airline later ruled out this possibility, saying all its flights had been accounted for. A spokesperson for the United States military confirmed the identity of the aircraft involved in the incident, which occurred in an area controlled by the Taliban. A Taliban spokesperson said to Al-Arabiyah that Taliban militias shot down the aircraft killing everyone on board, including high-ranking officials. However, these reports remain unconfirmed. Reports circulated by state-affiliated media of both Iran and Russia suggested that the Central Intelligence Agency's chief of Iran operations, Michael D'Andrea, was killed in the crash. These reports are also unconfirmed, and the CIA neither confirmed nor denied the presence of its officers aboard the crashed plane.

On 29 January 2020, Pentagon sources identified the airmen killed in the crash as Lieutenant Colonel Paul K. Voss of Yigo, Guam and Captain Ryan S. Phaneuf of Hudson, New Hampshire. Voss was 46 years old and had served in the Air Force for 25 years; Phaneuf was 30 years old and had served for eight years.

== Aircraft ==
The aircraft involved was a Bombardier Global Express outfitted by Northrop Grumman as an E-11A of the United States Air Force. Video of the crash scene shows that the aircraft serial number was 11–9358, msn 9358. The aircraft first flew in 2009 and was operated by the 430th Expeditionary Electronic Combat Squadron in the Battlefield Airborne Communications Node role. The aircraft involved in the crash was one of only four in the United States Air Force.

== Investigation and findings ==
American military authorities opened an investigation into the incident. The aircraft's flight data recorder was recovered.

The investigation concluded that the crash was caused by a broken turbine blade on the left engine compounded by pilot error. The crew misidentified which engine had failed. As a result, the pilots mistakenly shut off power to the right engine, believing the left engine was still intact. The failure to restart the correct engine in the air, and their attempt to return to Kandahar Air Base, substantially contributed to the mishap. With no working engines, the aircraft lacked the necessary altitude and airspeed to glide to the nearest base, forcing them to make an emergency landing on the snowy terrain, which proved too rugged to land safely.

== See also ==
- List of accidents and incidents involving military aircraft (2020–present)
