= Hawaii Route 30 =

State highway on Maui, Hawaii

Hawaii Route 30
- Honoapiʻilani Highway
- Route 30 (Honoapiʻilani Highway) in red and Route 3000 (Lahaina Bypass) in blue, prior to 2018 Bypass Extension

Route information
- Maintained by HDOT
- Length: 35.7 mi (57.5 km)

Major junctions
- North end: Route 32 in Wailuku
- Route 380 in Maalaea; Route 310 in Maalaea
- West end: Route 340 near Kapalua

Location
- Country: United States
- State: Hawaii
- Counties: Maui

Highway system
- Routes in Hawaii
← Route 22	→ Route 31

Hawaii Route 30, also known as the Honoapiʻilani Highway, is a 35-mile-long (56 km) road on West Maui, Hawaii.

It begins in downtown Wailuku, extending south through Waikapu and Māʻalaea before turning west. This portion of the highway, between Māʻalaea and Olowalu, is also known as the pali (Hawaiian for 'cliff'), as the highway winds between large cliff faces. This part of the highway, which opened in 1951, replaced a one-lane road higher in the hills. The highway then passes through the 318 feet (97 m) long Pali Tunnel, located at mile 10.4.

Following the terrain of the island, the highway continues to circumvent the West Maui Forest Reserve connecting Olowalu, Launiupoko, Lahaina, Kahana, through the regions of Kapalua and Honolua, and ending in Honokohau Bay. At this point the road continues as the Kahekili Highway, a "notoriously narrow and twisty" county-maintained road covering the northern coastline of West Maui and eventually terminating back in Wailuku. The eastern part of Kahekili Highway is signed as Hawaii Route 340. The two highways together, plus a short stretch of Hawaii Route 32, complete the circular journey around West Maui.

== Major intersections ==
The entire route is in Maui County.

Location	mi	km	Destinations	Notes
Wailuku	0.00	0.00	Route 32 east (Main Street) – Wailuku, ʻĪao Valley	Northern terminus; western terminus of Route 32
Maalaea	4.90	7.89	Route 380 north (Kuihelani Highway) – Kahului, Puunene	Southern terminus of Route 380
Maalaea	5.30	8.53	Route 310 east (North Kihei Road) – Kihei, Wailea, Makena	Western terminus of Route 310
Maalaea	7.40	11.91	Direction change between north–south and east–west	
Makahuna Gulch	10.40	16.74	Olowalu Tunnel	
Lahaina	16.70	26.88	Route 3000 north (Lahaina Bypass)	Southern terminus of Route 3000. Westbound must continue onto Route 3000. No eastbound exit.
Lahaina	21.60	34.76	Route 3000 south (Lahaina Bypass)	Northern terminus of Route 3000, access via Keawe Street
Kapalua	35.70	57.45	Route 340 south (Kahekili Highway)	Western terminus; northern terminus of Route 340
1.000 mi = 1.609 km; 1.000 km = 0.621 mi

== Related route ==
Hawaii Route 3000
- Location: Lahaina, Hawaii
- Length: 2.7 mi (4.3 km)
- Existed: December 2013–present

Hawaii Route 3000, also known as the Lahaina Bypass, is a highway that bypasses the town of Lahaina. The bypass opened to the public on April 23, 2018.

The bypass has its northern terminus in Downtown Lahaina along Keawe Street, before becoming the Lahaina Bypass, a four lane highway with occasional at-grade intersections, looping around the town, ending its at southern terminus at the Honoapiilani Highway.

Hawaii DOT plans call for the bypass to be extended to the north for about 5 miles (8 km). There is widespread support in Lahaina for such an extension, but as of 2025 there is no timeline for construction.

== Gallery ==
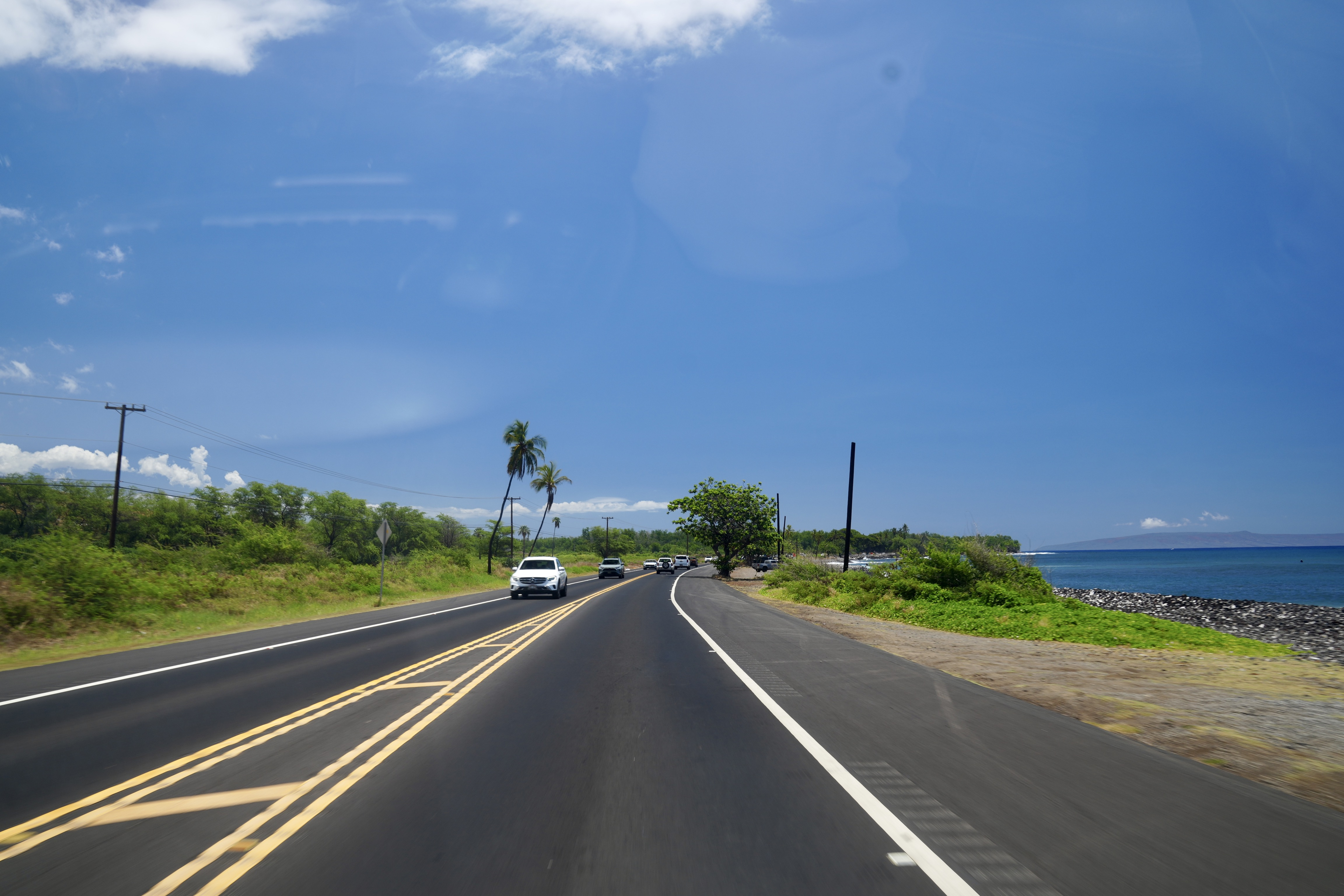
Hawaii Route 30 closely follows the Maui coast north of Lahaina.

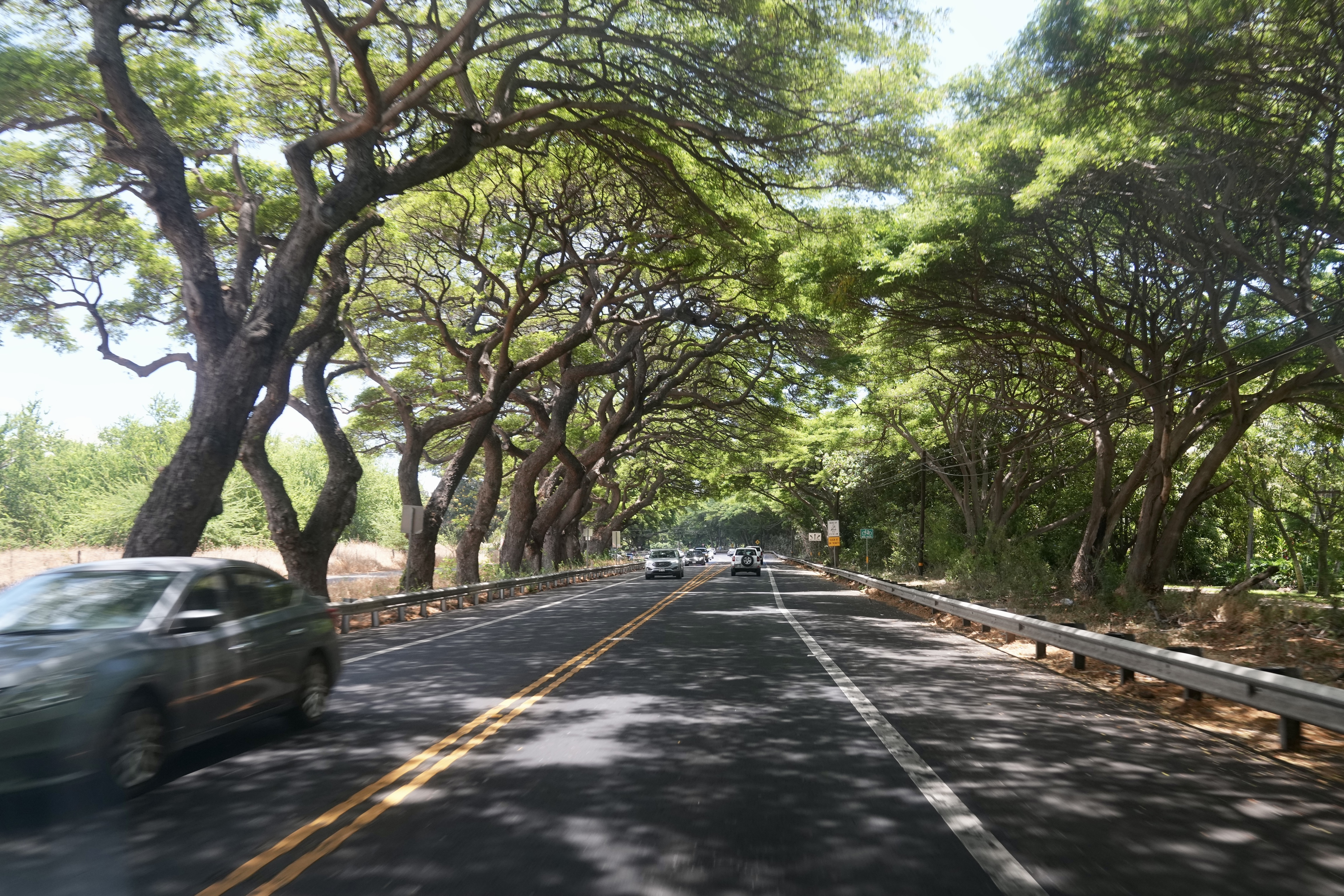
A tunnel of Monkeypod Trees on Hawaii Route 30, Maui.

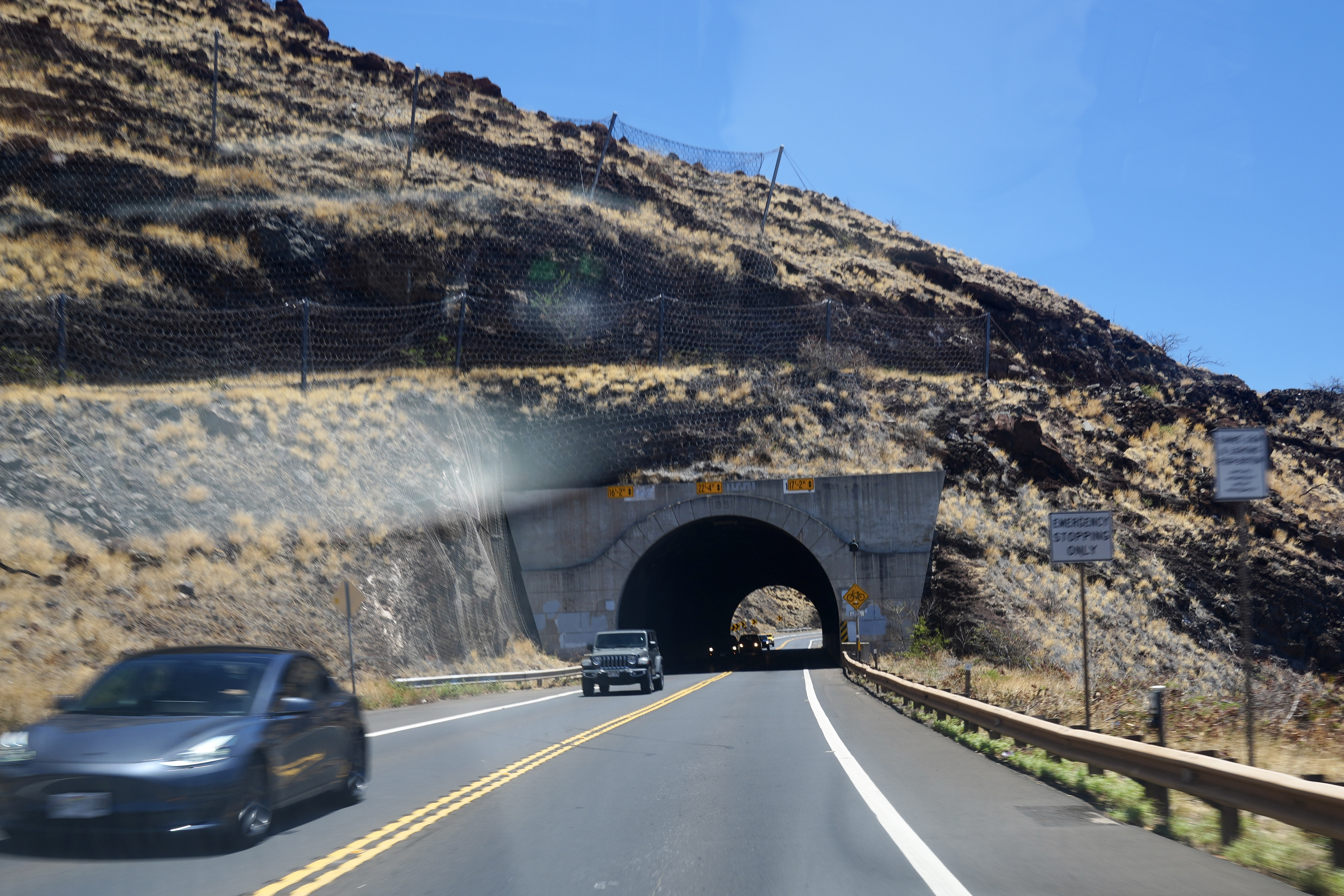
The Olowalu Tunnel on Maui is located at mile 10.4 on Hawaii Route 30 is 318 feet (97 m) long

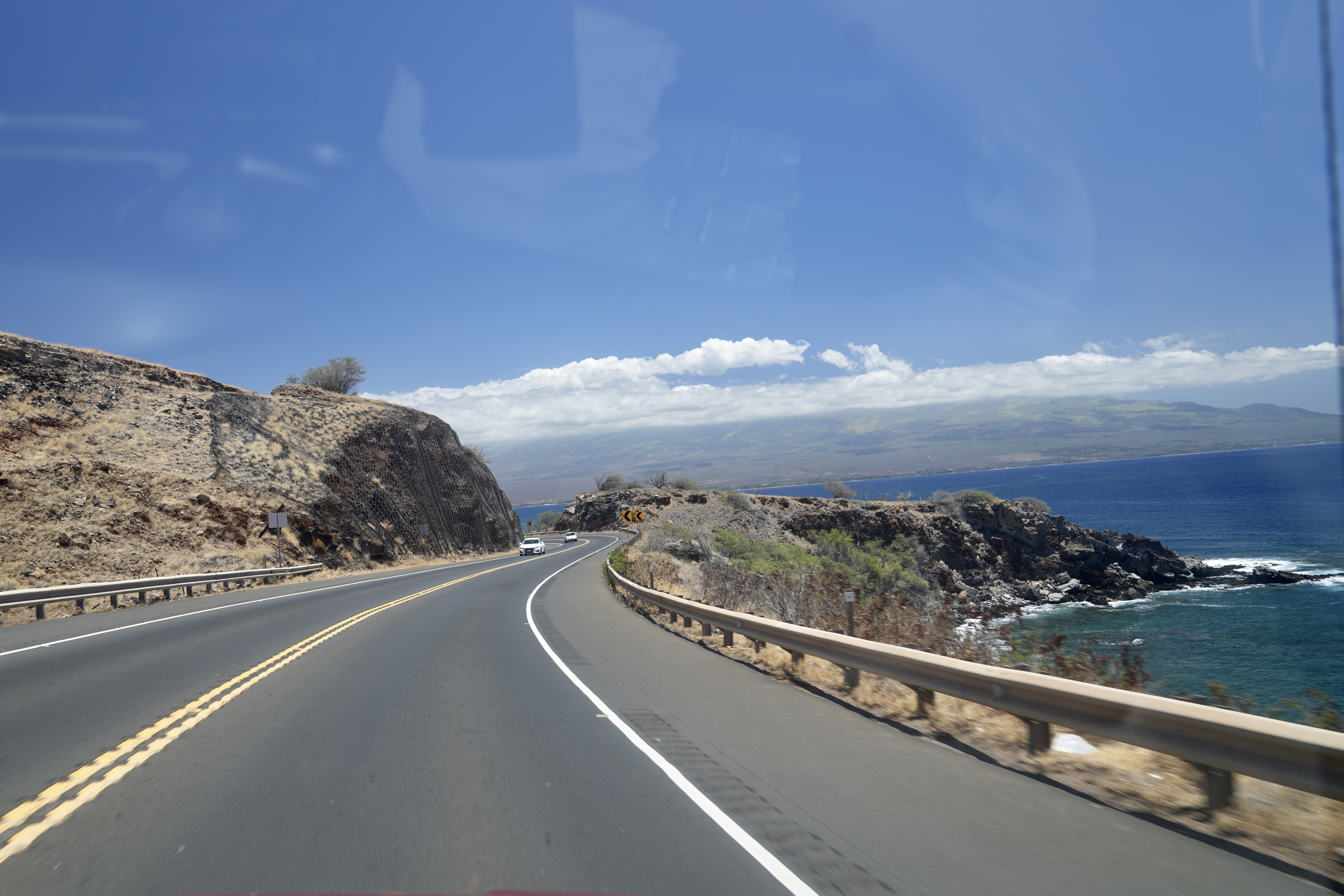
Hawaii Route 30 winds its way along the Maui Coast.
