= List of bridges on the National Register of Historic Places in Hawaii =

This is a list of bridges and tunnels on the National Register of Historic Places in the U.S. state of Hawaii.

Name	Image	Built	Listed	Location	County	Type
Ka'ahumanu Avenue-Naniloa Drive Overpass		1936	November 19, 2008	Wailuku; 20°53′19.36″N 156°29′45.67″W	Maui	
Opaekaa Road Bridge	Opaekaa Road Bridge	1894, 1895, 1919	1983-03-28	Kapaa; 22°3′49″N 159°22′51″W	Kauaʻi	
Pu'u'opae Bridge	Pu'u'opae Bridge	1915	2005-05-25	Kapa'a; 22°4′11″N 159°22′23″W	Kauaʻi	
Wai'ale Drive Bridge		1936	1998-10-30	Wailuku; 20°53′39″N 156°30′6″W	Maui	Rigid-frame steel-stringer
