= ʻIao Theater =

- U.S. National Register of Historic Places
- Hawaiʻi Register of Historic Places
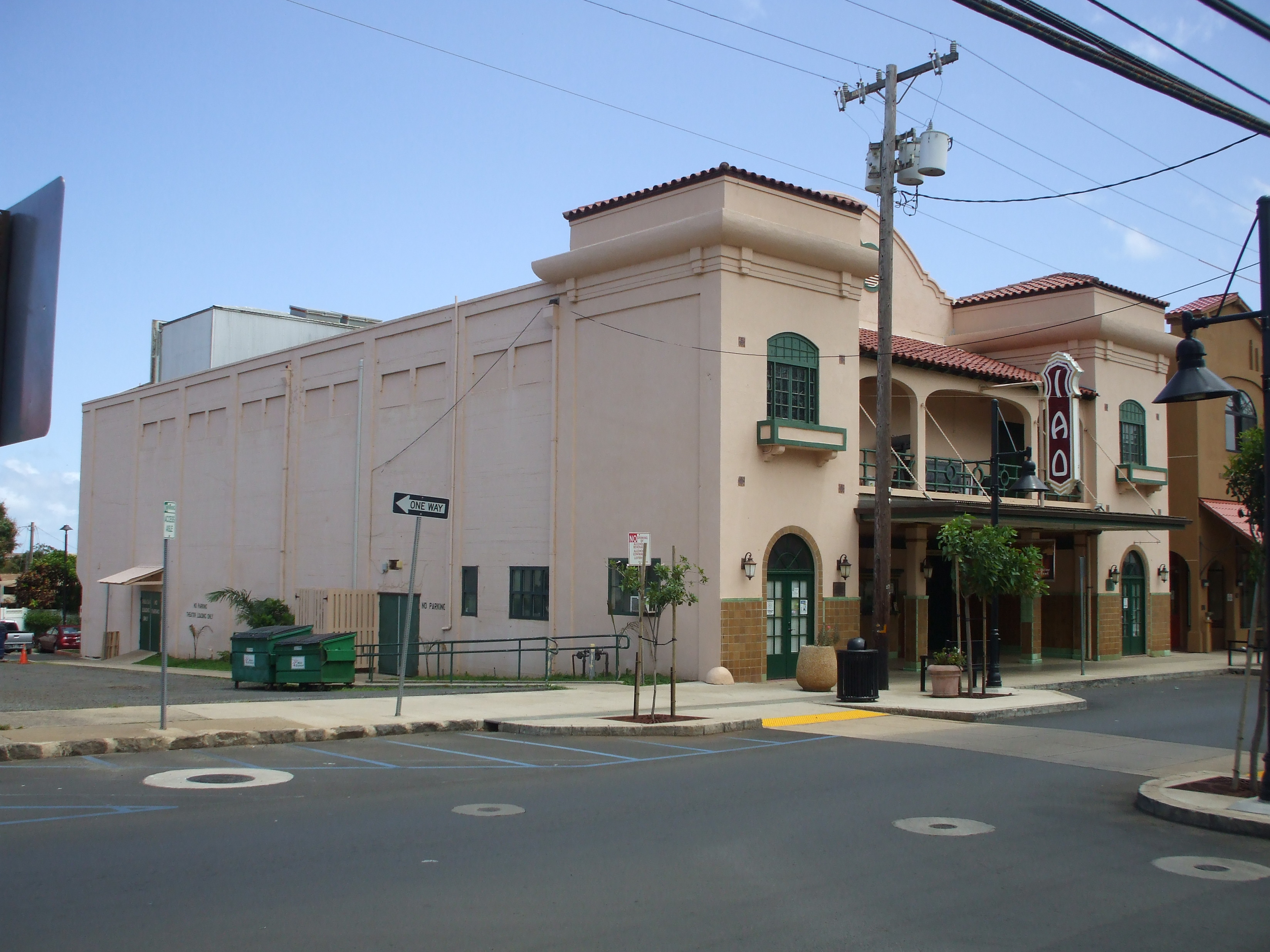
- Looking from the Public Defenders Office, March 2010

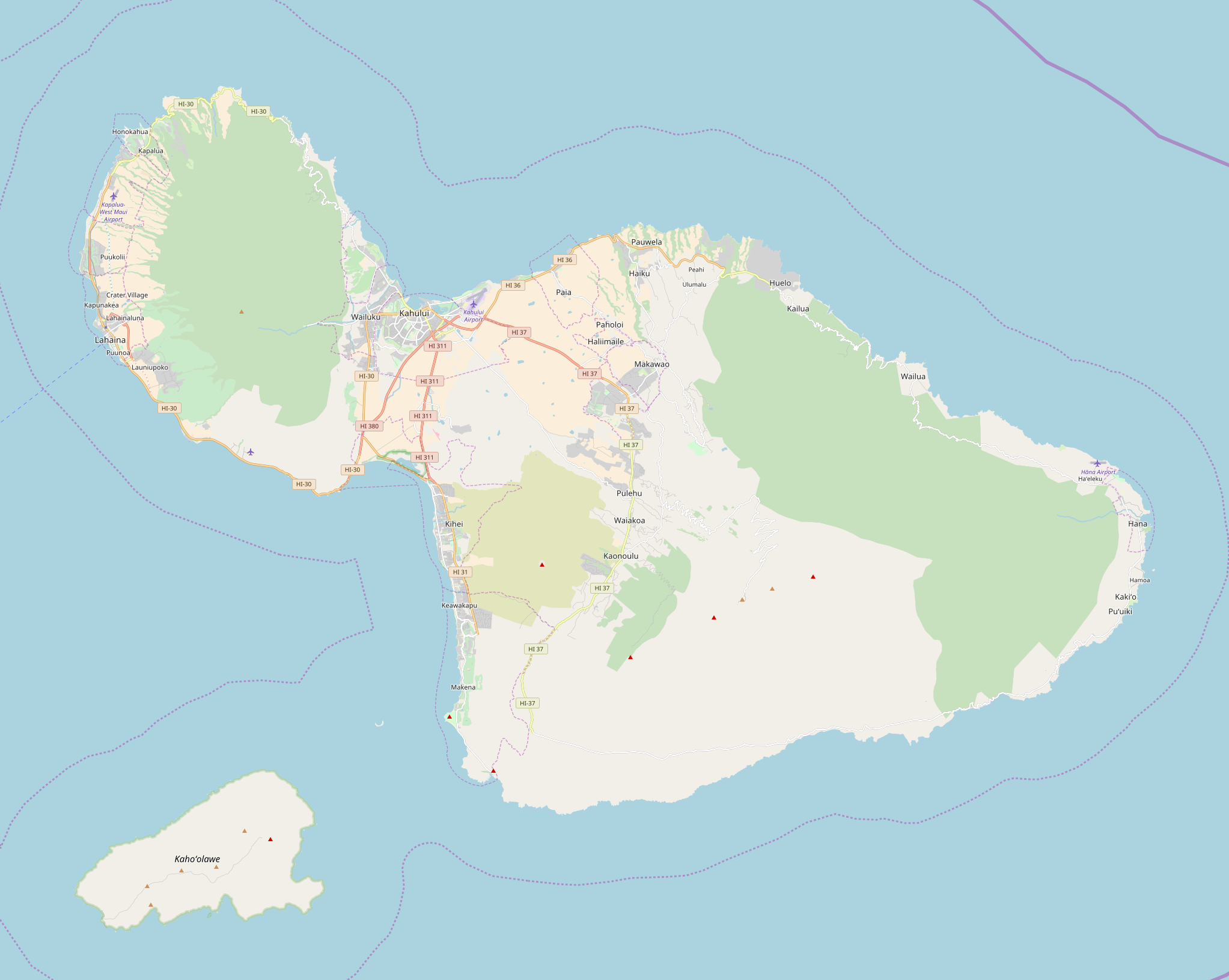
- Location within Maui Location within Hawaii
- Location: 68 North Market Street; Wailuku, Hawaii
- Coordinates: 20.888990°N 156.502021°W
- Area: Less than one acre
- Built: 1928
- Architect: Edward Walsh
- Architectural style: Mission/Spanish Revival
- NRHP reference No.: 94001622
- HRHP No.: 50-50-04-01627

Significant dates
- Added to NRHP: February 9, 1995
- Designated HRHP: June 24, 1994

The ʻIao Theater is a Spanish Mission style theater opened in 1928, in the city of Wailuku, Maui, Hawaii. It was originally both a movie and vaudeville house, until it fell into disrepair in the 1980s. Facing possible demolition, in 1994, it was listed on the State of Hawaii's Register of Historic Places. It was placed on the National Register of Historic Places in 1995. It later became the home of Maui OnStage, a community-based theatrical organization.

== History ==
In December 1927, Manuel Gomes Paschoal and H. B. Weller broke ground for ʻIao Theater on Market Street. The theater was designed by Edward Walsh. After nearly 9 months and $40,000 in construction costs, ʻIao Theater opened on August 22, 1928. The theater opened with a local play featuring local actors, and the showing of Sporting Goods starring Richard Dix at night.

The theater was one of several theaters in Wailuku, and was named after a small bait fish named the ʻiao.^{[a]} Aside from screening movies, the theater also hosted live onstage performances. Notable events included appearances by Bob Hope, Betty Hutton, and Frank Sinatra for USO shows during World War II, plus showed such movies as Rio Rita, and the X-rated film Deep Throat (which got the theater owner arrested). In 1953, the Hawaii debut of From Here to Eternity was staged at the ʻIao. A snack concession was run by Harry Kaya for almost 40 years, from 1930 to the mid-1970s, called Harry's Sweets. The location was just outside the main theater entrance. Local Hawaiian music artists such as Kealiʻi Reichel and Amy Hanaialiʻi Gilliom also gathered experience at the ʻIao.

By the early 1980s, after the theater closed down, the threat of demolition loomed. Maui Community theater first occupied the theater in 1984 for $200 a month, and community efforts commenced to help save the ʻIao from demolition. In July 1993, Maui County paid $882,000 to buy the 1-acre (4,000 m^{2}) site and the theater itself from the Lyons family trust after plans to demolish or convert the theater for other purposes materialized^{[b]} and spent $1.8 million on a partial restoration. The Hawaii State Register of Historic Places listed the ʻIao on June 24, 1994. It is the only surviving historic theater on Maui. The Department of the Interior placed the theater onto the National Register of Historic Places on February 9, 1995.

== Modern usage ==
As of 2010, Maui Community Theater, doing business as Maui OnStage, uses the theater for various functions. Redevelopment of the area also has included a 43 stall parking lot behind the theater.

== Gallery ==
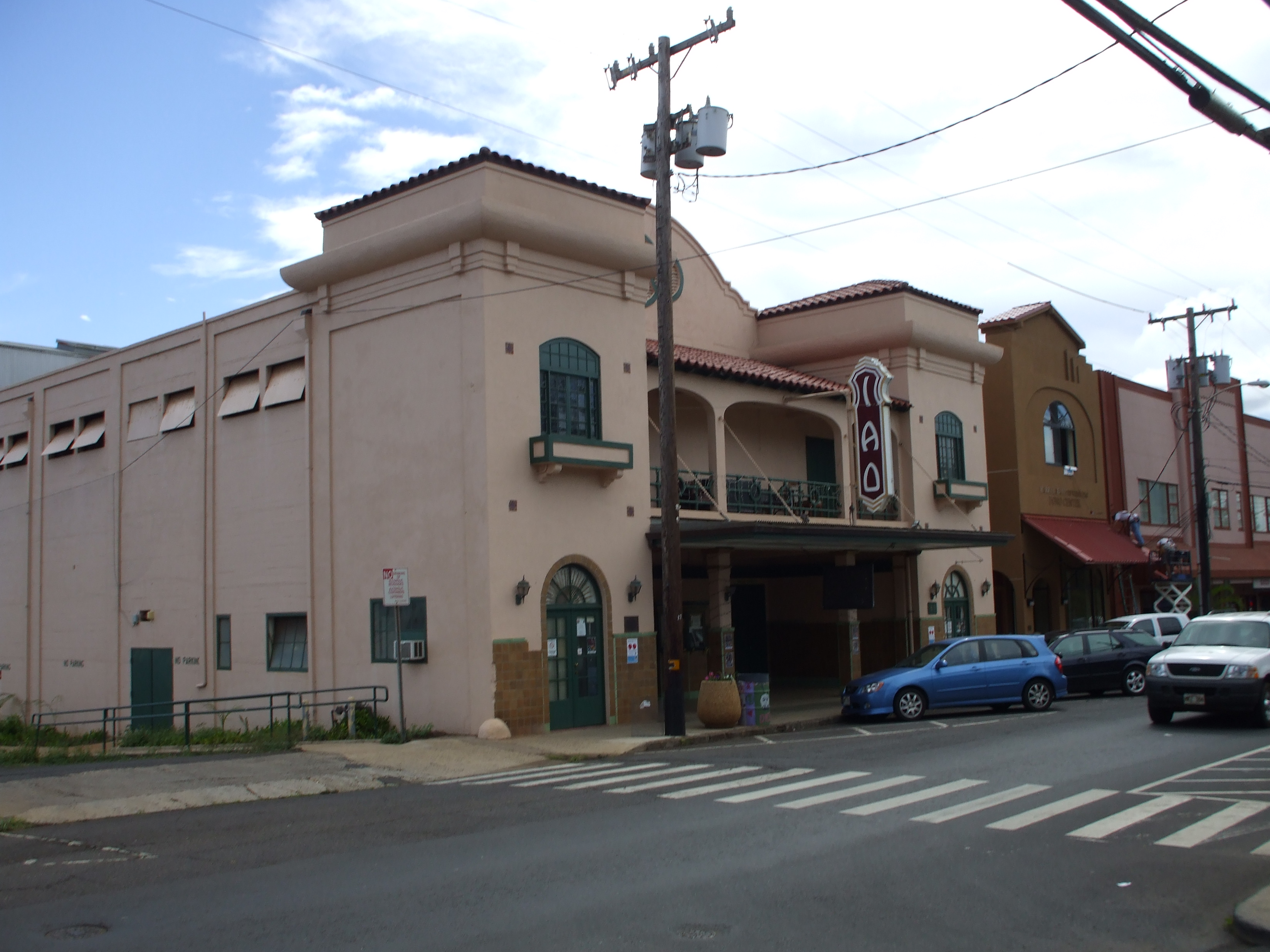
The building in 2007.

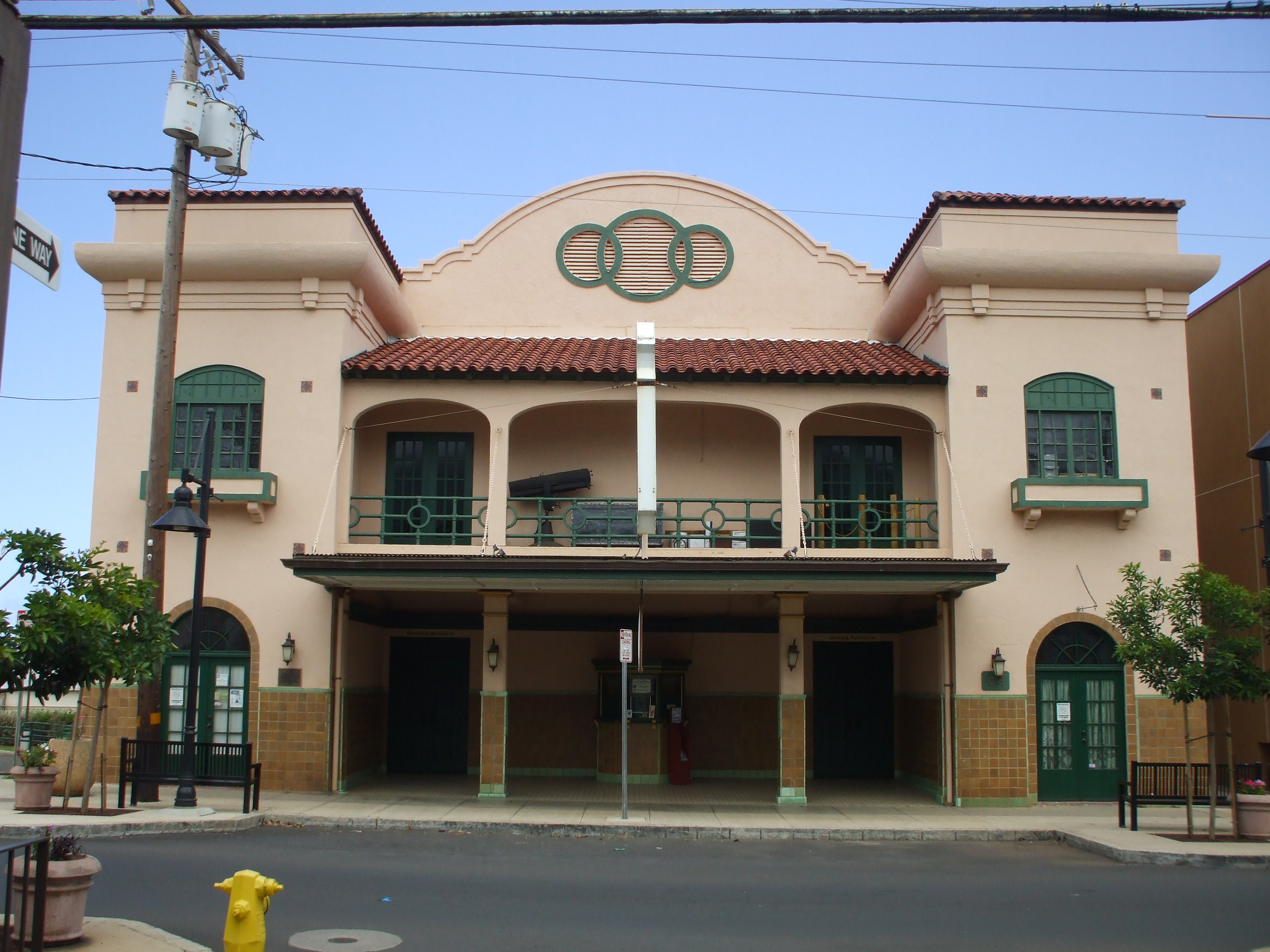
Front facade

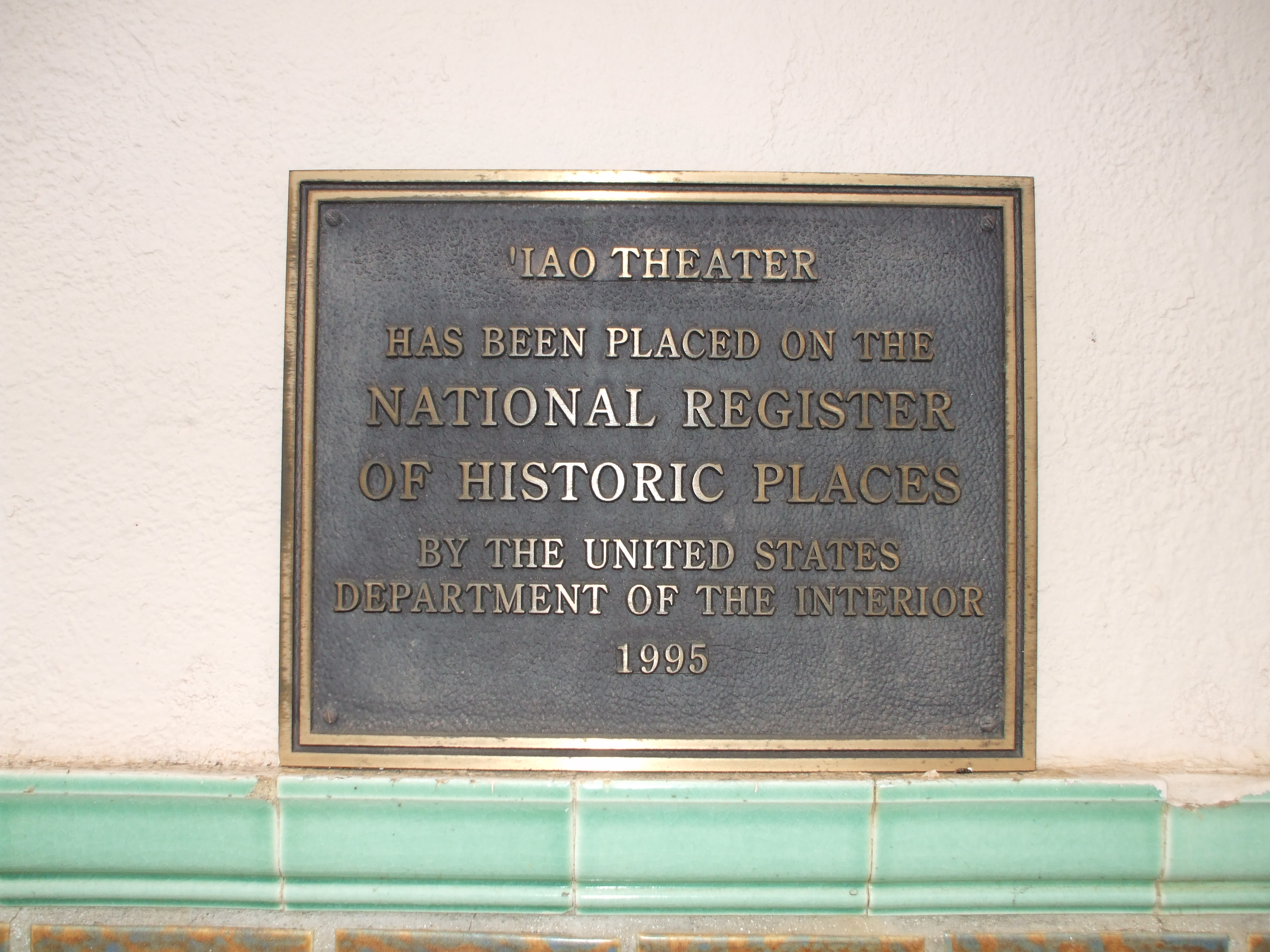
National Register Plaque affixed on the front of the building

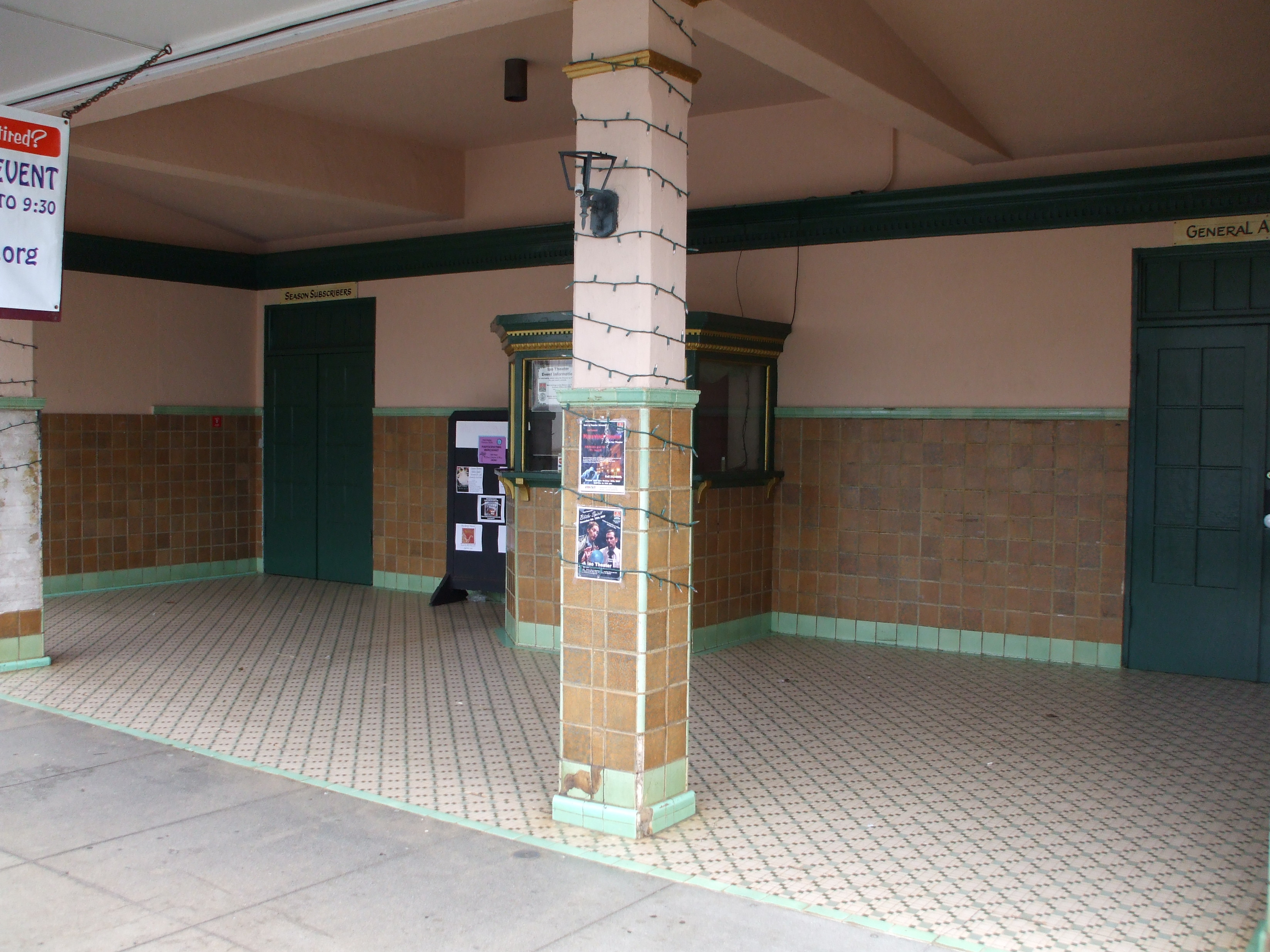
ʻIao Theater front ticketing area

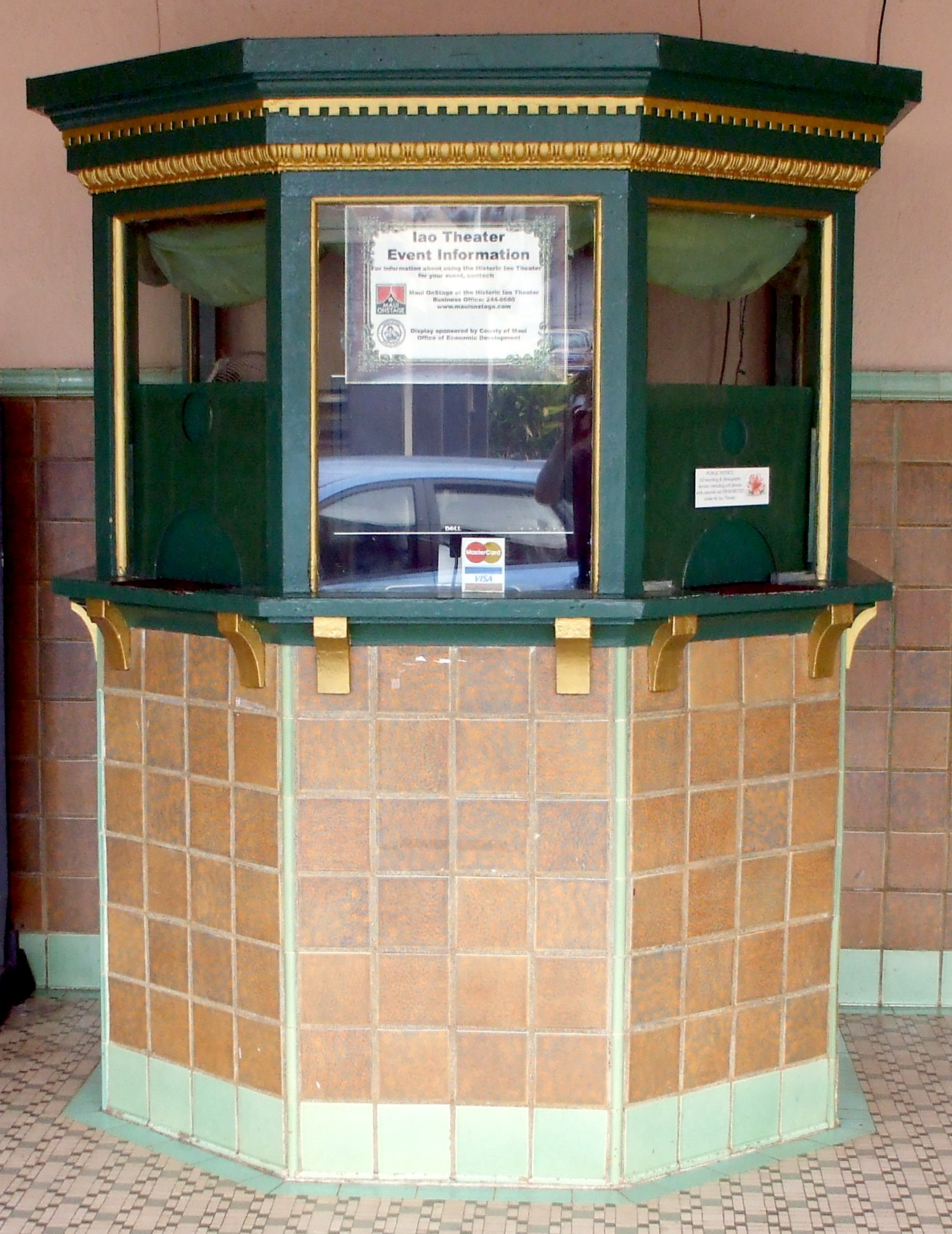
The Box Office

== Notes ==
- a. The book lists this reason, citing the theater was not named for ʻIao Valley.
- b. Maui News lists two contradicting plans in two separate articles; demolition to use the land for a shopping complex is referenced in one article while an editorial lists conversion to offices as the reason that prompted Maui County to save the ʻIao Theater.
