= Kaumālapaʻu, Hawaii =

Unincorporated community in Hawaii, United States

Coordinates: 20°47′13″N 156°59′22″W

Kaumālapaʻu is an unincorporated community in Maui County on the island of Lānaʻi in the state of Hawaii.

Kaumālapaʻu is a name derived from the Hawaiian language meaning "soot placed in gardens". Kaumālapaʻu was declared the "most difficult to pronounce" place name in the state of Hawaii by Reader's Digest.
