= Kealia Pond National Wildlife Refuge =

Wildlife sanctuary in Maui, Hawaii, U.S.

Kealia Pond
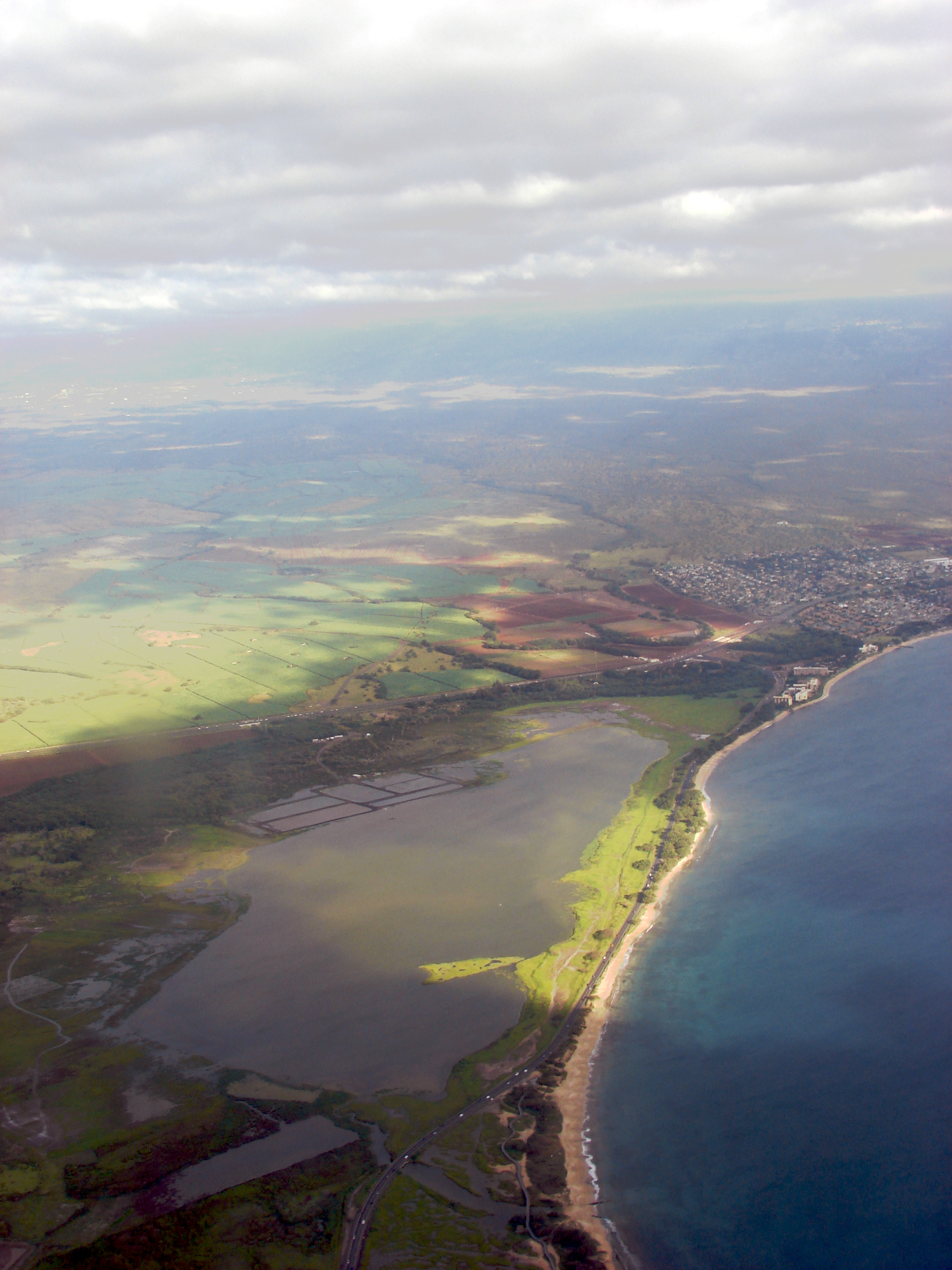
- Aerial view

- Location within Hawaii Location within Pacific Ocean
- Location: Maui, Hawaiʻi
- Coordinates: 20.79722°N 156.47833°W
- Type: coastal wetland, salt marsh
- Catchment area: 56 sq mi (150 km^{2})
- Basin countries: United States
- Surface area: 200 acres (81 ha), 450 acres (180 ha) (winter)
- Website: Kealia Pond National Wildlife Refuge

Kealia Pond National Wildlife Refuge is a coastal salt marsh along the south-central coast of Maui, Hawaiʻi. The refuge is located between the towns of Kihei and Maalaea, on both sides of North Kihei Road, Route 31. The wetland is also a 691-acre (2.80 km^{2}) bird sanctuary, home to 30 species of waterfowl, shorebirds, and migratory ducks, including the ʻaukuʻu (black-crowned night heron, Nycticorax nycticorax hoactli) and the endangered āeʻo (Hawaiian stilt, Himantopus mexicanus knudseni) and ʻalae keʻokeʻo (Hawaiian coot, Fulica alai). Kealia Pond was selected as a wildlife refuge in 1953, protecting an initial 300 acres (1.2 km^{2}) of land. The refuge joined the National Wildlife Refuge System in 1992.

== Description ==
In the rainy winter season, high water levels enlarge the freshwater pond to more than 400 acres (1.6 km^{2}). By spring, water levels begin dropping and by summer, the pond shrinks to half its winter size, leaving a salty residue behind: this accounts for its name, "Kealia", meaning "salt encrusted place"; Coastal salt pans once produced the mineral from seawater. The low water levels cause a 98% dieback in the tilapia population, which can produce a foul stench in the area.

Kealia was once an ancient fishpond supplied with water from the Waikapu Stream in the West Maui Mountains and Kolaloa Gulch originating from Haleakalā. Native Hawaiians may have raised awa (milkfish, Chanos chanos) and amaʻama (flathead mullet, Mugil cephalus) using a system of ditches and sluice gates to let nearby fish from Māʻalaea Beach into the pond.

Towards the west, the area between Kealia and the town of Māʻalaea contains another shallow pond and mudflats that are also used by the birds during the winter and spring flooding. When the mudflats dry out during the summer, the birds move to Kealia Pond. This area was once a runway serving one of Maui's first airports, Māʻalaea Airport. During World War II, Kealia Pond was used for training the 2nd and 4th Marine Divisions.

The site has hosted numerous vagrant birds, most notably Garganey, Curlew Sandpiper, Marbled Godwit, American Avocet, Spotted Sandpiper, and Eared Grebe.

== Boardwalk ==
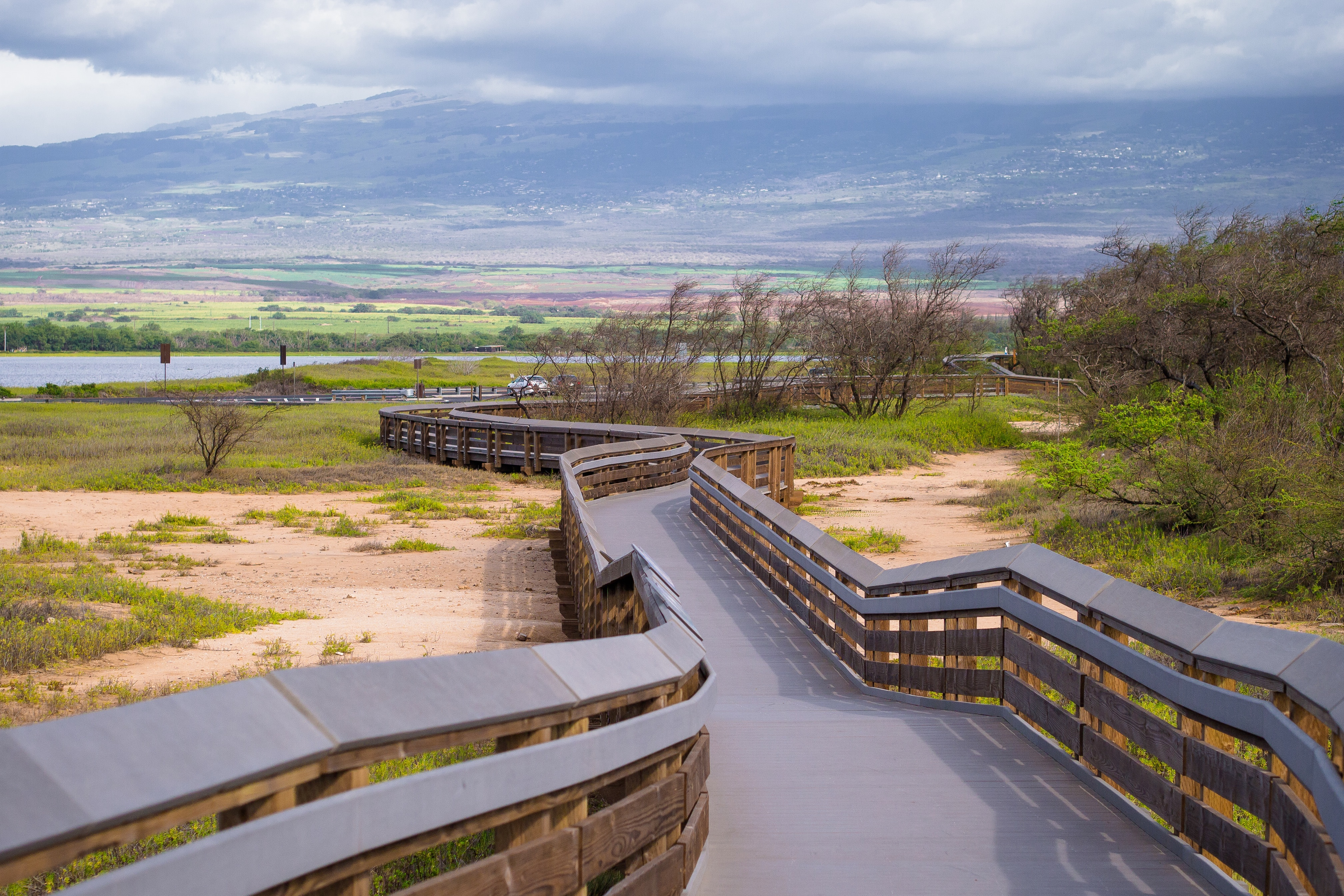
The boardwalk at Kealia Pond National Wildlife Refuge

A new boardwalk and 14-stall parking lot opened on North Kihei Road on September 8, 2009. The area encompasses the bird sanctuary next to Sugar Beach, open from 06:00 - 19:00, and is patrolled by private security.

== Images ==
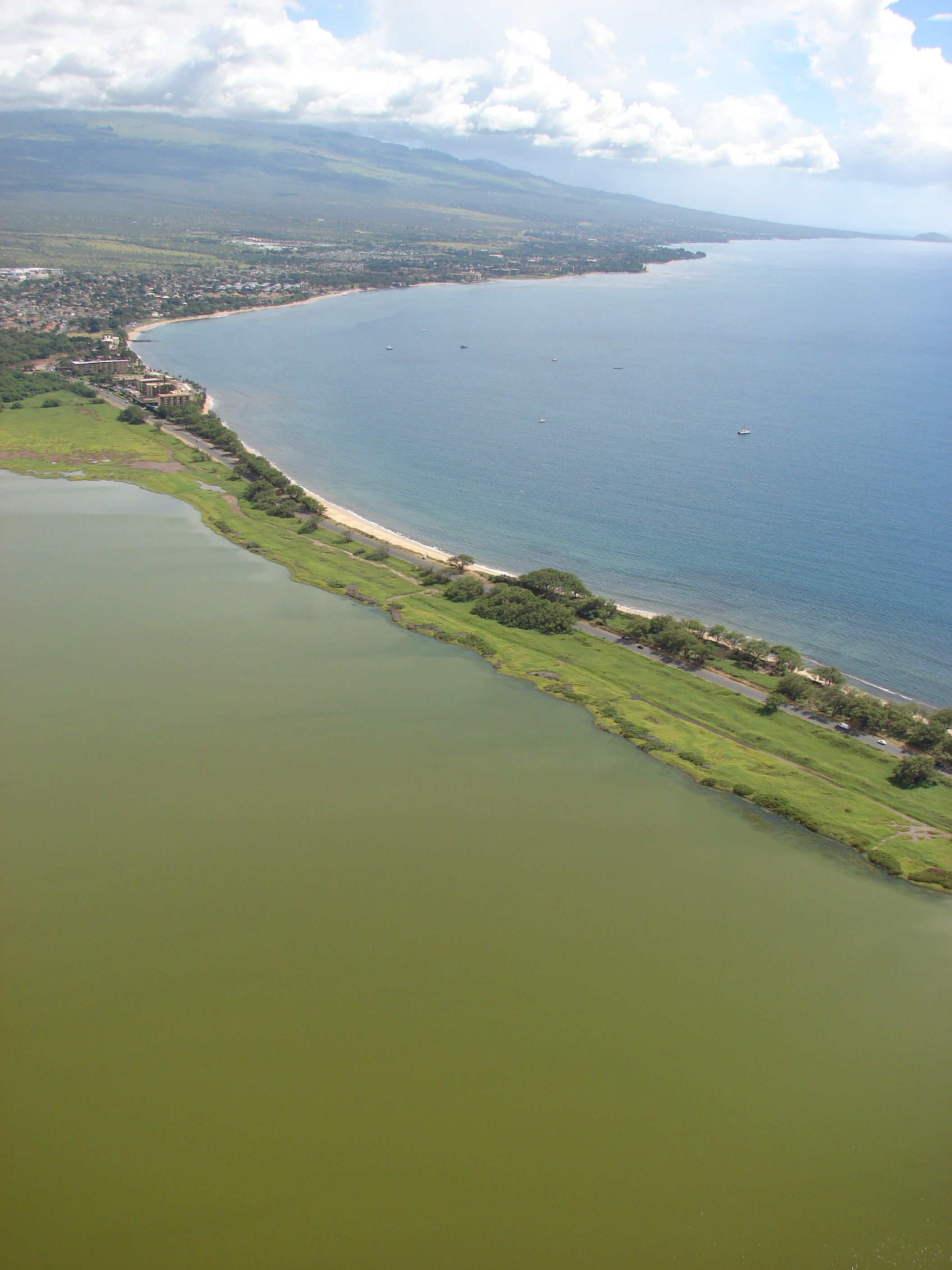
Cyperus laevigatus growing at the pond

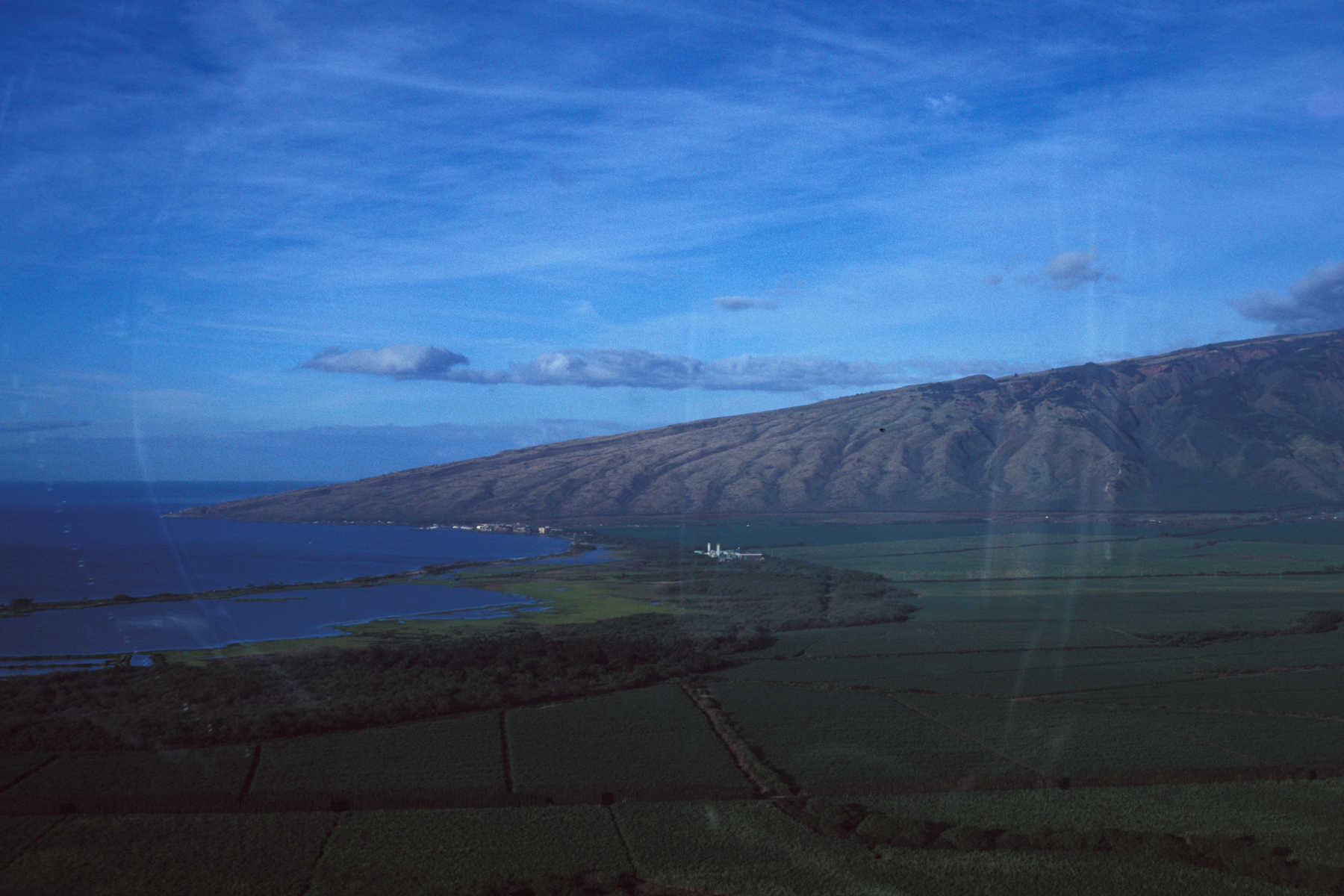
View facing towards West Maui

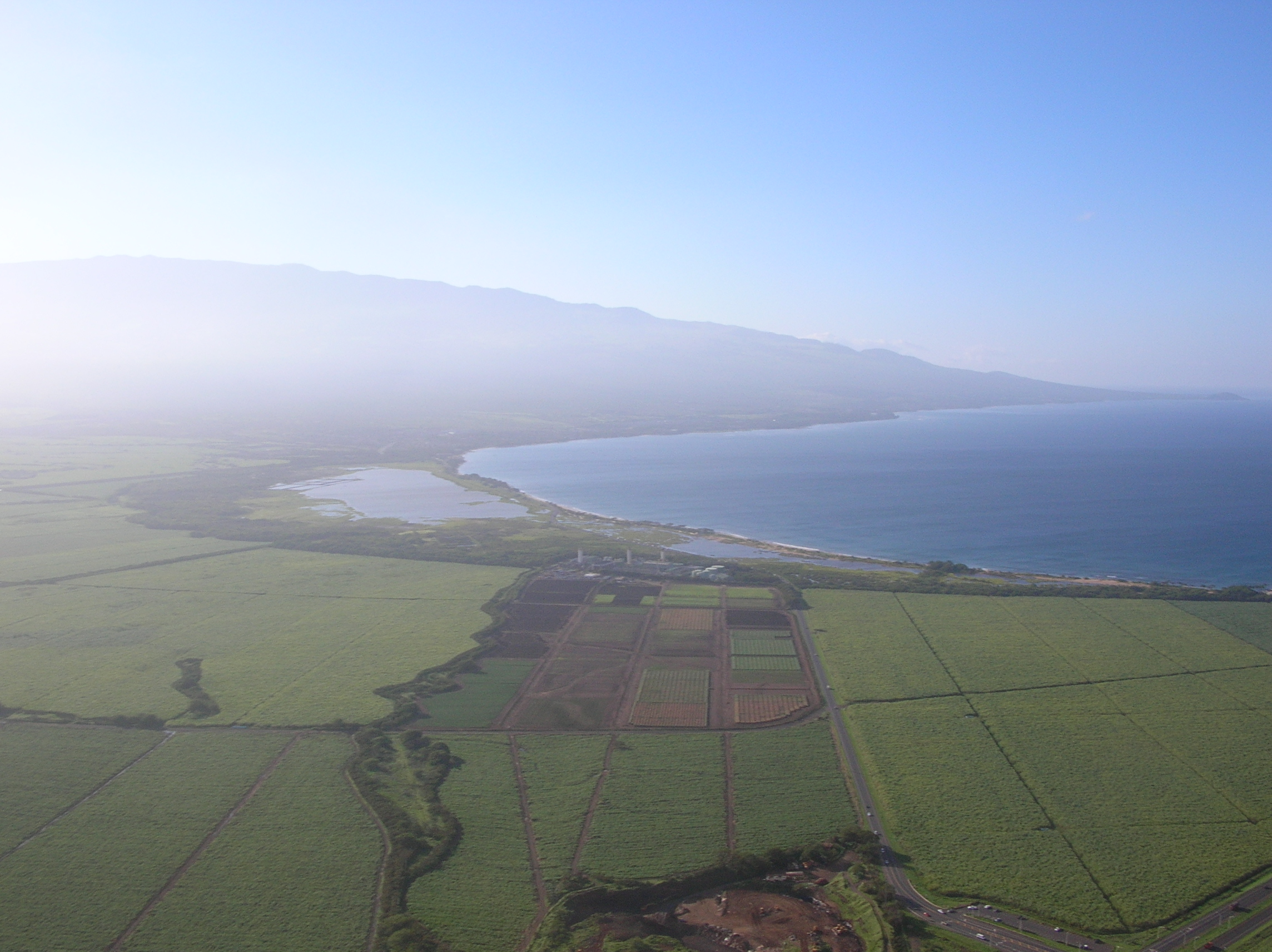
View facing South Maui
