= Tropical Gardens of Maui =

Former commercial nursery and botanical garden in Wailuku, Maui, Hawaii, United States

Coordinates: 20.88298°N 156.51756°W

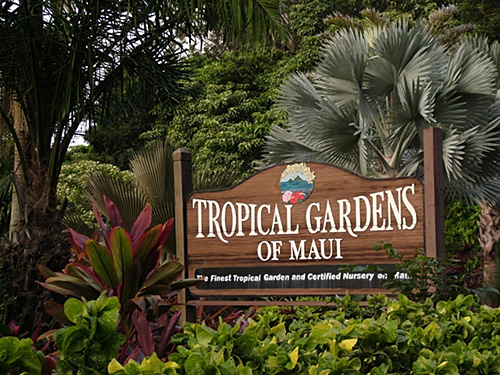
Sign for Tropical Gardens of Maui

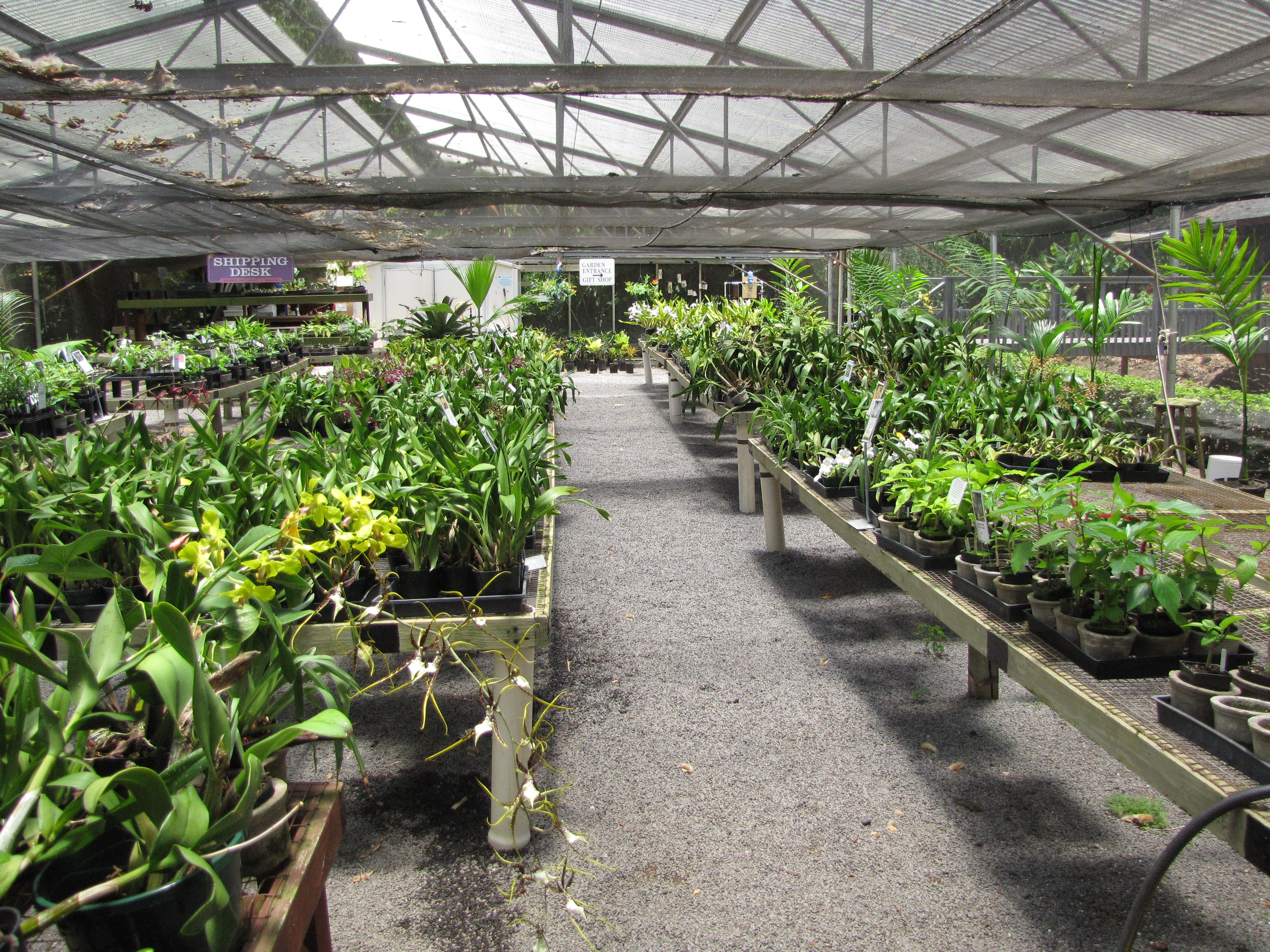
Nursery at Tropical Gardens of Maui, May 2012

Tropical Gardens of Maui was a 4-acre (1.6 ha) commercial nursery with botanical garden, located at 200 Iao Valley Road, Wailuku, Maui, Hawaii. The gardens were open daily without charge.

The gardens were established in 1987, and are located in a valley floor at approximately 800 feet (240 m) elevation. Plants were labeled with botanical name, common name, and country of origin. Representative plants included:

- a large variety of palms, including Archontophoenix, Areca, Arenga, Attalea cohune, Carpoxylon, Caryota, Chamaedorea, Clinostigma, Dypsis, Euterpe, Hyphaene, Licuala, Marojejya, Masoala, Mauritiella, Pelagodoxa, Phoenicophorium, Pinanga, Ptychosperma, Raphia, Ravenea, Wallichia;
- cycads, including Bowenia, Cycas, Dioon, Encephalartos, Lepidozamia, and Zamia;
- fruit trees, including Anacardium occidentale, Averrhoa carambola, Chrysophyllum cainito, Casimiroa edulis, Clausena lansium, Eugenia malaccensis, Euphoria longan, Malpighia emarginata, Manilkara zapota, Nephelium lappaceum, Pachira aquatica, Phyllanthus acidus, Pouteria campechiana, Psidium guajava, and Theobroma cacao;
- Hawaiian endemic and native plants including Abutilon menziesii, Artemisia spp., Erythrina sandwicensis, Gossypium tomentosum, Hibiscus spp., Portulaca molokiniensis, Santalum ellipticum, Sesbania tomentosa, and Wilkesia gymnoxiphium.

It was closed to public tours in mid-2014.

== See also ==
- List of botanical gardens in the United States
