= Ah Fong Village, Hawaii =

Census-designated place in Hawaii, United States

Coordinates: 20.8533321°N 156.4822318°W

Ah Fong Village, Hawaii is a census-designated place (CDP) in Maui County, Hawaiʻi, United States. As of 2010, the population is 16.

Ah Fong Village is named after Chun Afong (Ah Fong), Hawaii's first millionaire.

In 1849, Chun Afong left behind his wife and son in his hometown, Zhongshan (Xiangshan) county in China. He settled in the Kingdom of Hawaii with about a hundred Chinese residents and opened a shop near King Street. In only six years, the Chinese immigrant made a fortune in retailing, real estate, sugar, rice, and opium.

Afong married Julia Fayerweather, the seventeen-year-old granddaughter of a Hawaiian chief (last name Kealoha) and raised four sons and twelve daughters.

In 1889, Afong would return to China with his younger son Toney, to the village of Meixi. He earned more money through business and funded projects to improve the village. Afong died in 1906, and his family later fought for his fortune in court.

Chun Afong's name was also spelled as Chong Afong, Chun Ah Fong, and Chen Fang.
