= Maui County, Hawaii =

County in Hawaii, United States

- County
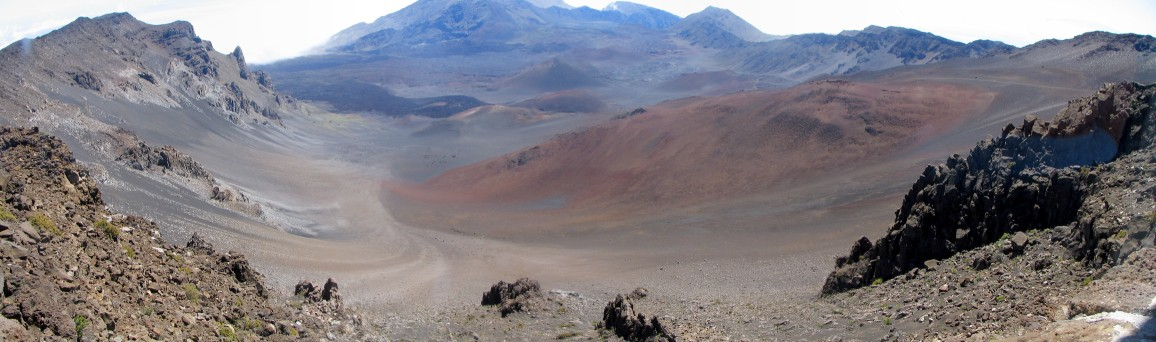
- Haleakalā National Park

- Flag Seal

- Location within the U.S. state of Hawaii
- Coordinates: 20°52′04″N 156°37′01″W
- Country: United States
- State: Hawaii
- Founded: 1905
- Seat: Wailuku
- Largest community: Kahului

Government
  - Mayor: Richard Bissen

Area
  - Total: 2,398 sq mi (6,210 km^{2})
  - Land: 1,162 sq mi (3,010 km^{2})
  - Water: 1,237 sq mi (3,200 km^{2}) 51.6%

Population (2020)
  - Total: 164,754
  - Estimate (2025): 160,592 ▼
  - Density: 133/sq mi (51/km^{2})
- Time zone: UTC−10 (Hawaii–Aleutian)
- Congressional district: 2nd
- Website: www.mauicounty.gov

Maui County (Hawaiian: Kalana ʻo Maui), officially the County of Maui, is a county in the U.S. state of Hawaii. It consists of the islands of Maui, Lānaʻi, Molokaʻi (except for a portion of Molokaʻi that comprises Kalawao County), Kahoʻolawe, and Molokini. The latter two are uninhabited. As of the 2020 census, the population was 164,754. The county seat is Wailuku.

Maui County is included in the Kahului-Wailuku-Lahaina, HI Metropolitan Statistical Area.

== Government ==
Maui County has a quasi-mayor-council form of municipal government. Unlike traditional municipal governments, the county government is established by the state legislature by statute and is not chartered. Executive authority is vested in the mayor, elected by the voters on a nonpartisan basis to a four-year term (with a limit of two consecutive full terms). Legislative authority is vested in the nine-member Maui County Council. All seats in the county council have residency requirements, but all Maui County voters may vote in elections for all nine seats regardless of residence. Members of the county council are elected on a nonpartisan basis to two-year terms (with a limit of five consecutive full terms).

The mayor of Maui County is Richard Bissen, serving since January 2023. Richard Bissen formerly served as a Judge for the 2nd Hawaii State Circuit Court.

The parade banner of the county, described simply as "parade banner of the County of Maui", this banner is vertically divided light blue-light green-light blue, by red stripes, with a seal in the center.

The Maui County Police Department provides law enforcement services for the county. The current chief is John Pelletier.

== Geography ==
According to the U.S. Census Bureau, the county has a total area of 2,398 square miles (6,210 km^{2}), of which 1,162 square miles (3,010 km^{2}) is land and 1,237 square miles (3,200 km^{2}) (51.6%) is water. The islands that comprise Maui County correspond to the remnants of the ancient landmass of Maui Nui. The highest point in the county is the peak of Haleakalā at 10,023 feet (3,055 m). Haleakalā is a shield volcano located on the eastern side of the island of Maui.

=== Adjacent counties ===
- Hawaiʻi County, Hawaii – southeast
- Kalawao County, Hawaii – north
- Honolulu County, Hawaii – northwest

=== National protected areas ===
- Haleakalā National Park
- Kakahaiʻa National Wildlife Refuge
- Kealia Pond National Wildlife Refuge
- Kalaupapa National Historical Park

== Demographics ==
Historical population
Census	Pop.	Note	%±
1900	26,743		—
1910	29,762		11.3%
1920	37,385		25.6%
1930	55,541		48.6%
1940	55,534		0.0%
1950	48,179		−13.2%
1960	42,576		−11.6%
1970	45,984		8.0%
1980	70,847		54.1%
1990	100,374		41.7%
2000	128,094		27.6%
2010	154,834		20.9%
2020	164,754		6.4%
2025 (est.)	160,592	▼	−2.5%
U.S. Decennial Census; 1790–1960 1900–1990; 1990–2000 2010–2020

Maui County, Hawaii – Racial composition Note: the US Census treats Hispanic/Latino as an ethnic category. This table excludes Latinos from the racial categories and assigns them to a separate category. Hispanics/Latinos may be of any race.
Race (NH = Non-Hispanic)	% 2020	% 2010	% 2000	Pop 2020	Pop 2010	Pop 2000
White alone (NH)	31.5%	31.8%	31.9%	51,926	49,193	40,918
Black alone (NH)	0.6%	0.5%	0.4%	1,010	818	481
American Indian alone (NH)	0.2%	0.2%	0.3%	400	380	351
Asian alone (NH)	26.3%	28%	30.3%	43,284	43,384	38,803
Pacific Islander alone (NH)	11.5%	9.9%	10.3%	18,966	15,257	13,172
Other race alone (NH)	0.5%	0.2%	0.2%	822	246	206
Multiracial (NH)	19.1%	19.3%	18.8%	31,432	29,846	24,113
Hispanic/Latino (any race)	10.3%	10.1%	7.8%	16,914	15,710	10,050

=== 2020 census ===
As of the 2020 census, the county had a population of 164,754. Of the residents, 21.3% were under the age of 18 and 19.2% were 65 years of age or older; the median age was 42.4 years. For every 100 females there were 98.9 males, and for every 100 females age 18 and over there were 96.9 males. 78.6% of residents lived in urban areas and 21.4% lived in rural areas.

The racial makeup of the county was 32.9% White, 0.6% Black or African American, 0.5% American Indian and Alaska Native, 26.9% Asian, 12.1% Native Hawaiian and Pacific Islander, 2.6% from some other race, and 24.4% from two or more races. Hispanic or Latino residents of any race comprised 10.3% of the population.

There were 56,063 households in the county, of which 32.3% had children under the age of 18 living with them and 25.1% had a female householder with no spouse or partner present. About 24.0% of all households were made up of individuals and 10.9% had someone living alone who was 65 years of age or older.

There were 71,439 housing units, of which 21.5% were vacant. Among occupied housing units, 58.6% were owner-occupied and 41.4% were renter-occupied. The homeowner vacancy rate was 1.3% and the rental vacancy rate was 12.7%.

The most reported detailed ancestries in 2020 were:

- Filipino (28.4%)
- Native Hawaiian (24%)
- Japanese (12.9%)
- German (11%)
- English (10.8%)
- Irish (10.5%)
- Chinese (8.8%)
- Portuguese (6.9%)
- Mexican (4%)
- Italian (3.5%)

As of the 2000 Census, there were 128,094 people, 43,507 households, and 29,889 families residing in the county. The population density was 110 people per square mile (42 people/km^{2}). There were 56,377 housing units at an average density of 49 per square mile (19/km^{2}). The racial makeup of the county was 33.01% Asian, 28.90% White, 22.24% from two or more races, 10.72% Pacific Islander, 1.40% Black or African American, 0.37% Native American and 1.36% from other races. 7.8% of the population were Hispanic or Latino of any race.

There were 43,507 households, out of which 33.00% had children under the age of 18 living with them, 50.90% were married couples living together, 12.00% had a female householder with no husband present, and 31.30% were non-families. 21.90% of all households were made up of individuals, and 6.30% had someone living alone who was 65 years of age or older. The average household size was 2.91 and the average family size was 3.41.

In the county, 25.50% of the population was under the age of 18, 7.70% was from 18 to 24, 30.90% from 25 to 44, 24.40% from 45 to 64, and 11.40% was 65 years of age or older. The median age was 37 years. For every 100 females, there were 100.90 males. For every 100 females age 18 and over, there were 100.20 males.

=== 2020 religious survey ===
Maui County is among the most religiously diverse counties in the US. A 2020 survey by the Public Religion Research Institute calculated a religious diversity score of 0.867 for Maui County, where a score of 1 represents complete diversity (each religious group of equal size), and 0 being a total lack of diversity. Only eight counties in the US had higher diversity scores than Maui County, three of which were boroughs of New York City.

== Economy ==
=== Top employers ===
According to the county's 2022 Annual Comprehensive Financial Report, the top employers in the county are the following:

#	Employer	# of Employees
1	State of Hawaii	5,030
2	Maui County	2,436
3	Grand Wailea Resort & Spa	1,400
4	Ritz-Carlton-Kapalua	1,000
5	United States Federal Government	900
6	Maui Memorial Medical Center	800
6	Four Seasons Resort Maui	800
7	Fairmont Kea Lani	700
7	Four Seasons Lānaʻi	700
7	Westin Maui Resort & Spa	700
8	Kea Lani Maui Restaurant	600
9	Hale Makua Health Service	500
9	Kaanapali Beach Club	500
9	Montage Kapalua Bay	500
9	Walmart	500
9	Royal Lahaina Resort	500
10	Wailea Beach Resort – Marriott	420

== Transportation ==
=== Airports ===
Three airports provide air service to the island of Maui:

- Hana Airport provides regional service to eastern Maui
- Kahului Airport in central Maui is the island's busiest airport
- Kapalua Airport provides regional service to western Maui

There are also airports on Maui's smaller adjacent islands:

- Lānaʻi Airport provides regional service to Lānaʻi
- Molokai Airport provides regional service to Molokaʻi

=== Major highways ===
- Route 30
- Route 31
- Route 32
- Route 36
- Route 37
- Route 44
- Route 305
- Route 310
- Route 311
- Route 320
- Route 330
- Route 340
- Route 377
- Route 378
- Route 380
- Route 440
- Route 450
- Route 460
- Route 465
- Route 470
- Route 480
- Route 3000

== Communities ==
=== Census-designated places ===
- Haʻikū-Pauwela
- Hāliʻimaile
- Hāna
- Kāʻanapali
- Kahului
- Kapalua
- Kaunakakai
- Kēōkea
- Kīhei
- Kualapuʻu
- Kula
- Lahaina
- Lānaʻi City
- Launiupoko
- Māʻalaea
- Māhinahina
- Makawao
- Mākena
- Mānele
- Maunaloa
- Nāpili-Honokōwai
- Olinda
- Olowalu
- Pāʻia
- Pukalani
- ʻUalapuʻe
- Waiheʻe-Waiehu
- Waikapū
- Wailea
- Wailuku (county seat)

United States Senate election results for Maui County, Hawaii1
Year	Republican		Democratic		Third party(ies)	
Year	No.	%	No.	%	No.	%
2024	17,188	28.45%	40,789	67.51%	2,438	4.04%
2018	11,381	23.16%	37,753	76.84%	0	0.00%
2012	15,096	31.28%	33,169	68.72%	0	0.00%

United States Senate election results for Maui County, Hawaii3
Year	Republican		Democratic		Third party(ies)	
Year	No.	%	No.	%	No.	%
2022	11,202	22.08%	37,565	74.04%	1,966	3.88%
2016	10,203	20.44%	37,214	74.55%	2,498	5.00%
2014	10,165	23.39%	31,668	72.86%	1,634	3.76%
2010	8,006	19.57%	31,301	76.52%	1,598	3.91%

=== Unincorporated communities ===
- Ah Fong Village
- Haʻikū
- Kaumalapau
- Keʻanae
- Kīpahulu
- Nāpili
- Puʻunēnē
- Spreckelsville
- Waiheʻe
- Wailua

Gubernatorial election results for Maui County, Hawaii
Year	Republican		Democratic		Third party(ies)	
Year	No.	%	No.	%	No.	%
2022	17,641	34.21%	33,930	65.79%	0	0.00%
2018	14,702	29.81%	32,142	65.18%	2,469	5.01%
2014	12,614	28.01%	23,699	52.63%	8,714	19.35%
2010	16,024	38.21%	25,516	60.85%	396	0.94%

=== Former communities ===
- Waikola

== Politics ==
United States presidential election results for Maui County, Hawaii
Year	Republican		Democratic		Third party(ies)	
Year	No.	%	No.	%	No.	%
1960	8,848	54.79%	7,302	45.21%	0	0.00%
1964	3,553	21.91%	12,666	78.09%	0	0.00%
1968	6,401	37.76%	10,313	60.84%	237	1.40%
1972	11,618	61.09%	7,399	38.91%	0	0.00%
1976	10,318	45.78%	11,921	52.89%	299	1.33%
1980	10,359	40.23%	12,674	49.22%	2,718	10.55%
1984	14,720	52.45%	12,966	46.20%	381	1.36%
1988	12,944	41.96%	17,532	56.83%	374	1.21%
1992	11,151	30.17%	18,962	51.31%	6,845	18.52%
1996	9,323	26.74%	20,600	59.08%	4,944	14.18%
2000	12,876	32.81%	23,484	59.83%	2,888	7.36%
2004	18,187	38.34%	28,803	60.73%	440	0.93%
2008	11,154	21.54%	39,727	76.71%	908	1.75%
2012	11,602	23.85%	36,052	74.10%	999	2.05%
2016	13,446	25.89%	33,480	64.45%	5,019	9.66%
2020	22,126	31.14%	47,305	66.59%	1,613	2.27%
2024	22,621	35.97%	38,905	61.86%	1,367	2.17%

Like all of Hawaii, Maui County is reliably Democratic. It has only been carried by the Republican presidential candidate three times since its statehood in 1959: in 1960, 1972, and 1984.

Maui County was the only county in the United States to be won by Dennis Kucinich during his unsuccessful campaign for the Democratic Party nomination to the presidency in 2004.

== Education ==
Hawaii Department of Education operates public schools in Maui County.

== Sister cities ==
Maui County's sister cities are:

- American Samoa
- Arequipa, Peru
- Bacarra, Philippines
- Badoc, Philippines
- Cabugao, Philippines
- Easter Island, Chile
- Embo, Scotland, United Kingdom
- Fukuyama, Japan
- Funchal, Portugal
- Goyang, South Korea
- Hachijō, Japan
- Manila, Philippines
- Pingtung, Taiwan
- Puerto Princesa, Philippines
- Quezon City, Philippines
- Saipan, Northern Mariana Islands
- San Juan, Philippines
- Santa, Philippines
- Sanya, China
- São Miguel Island, Portugal
- Sarrat, Philippines
- Zambales, Philippines

== See also ==
- Maui
- Kula
- Vic-Maui Yacht Race
