= Launiupoko, Hawaii =

Unincorporated community in Hawaii, U.S.

- Census-designated place
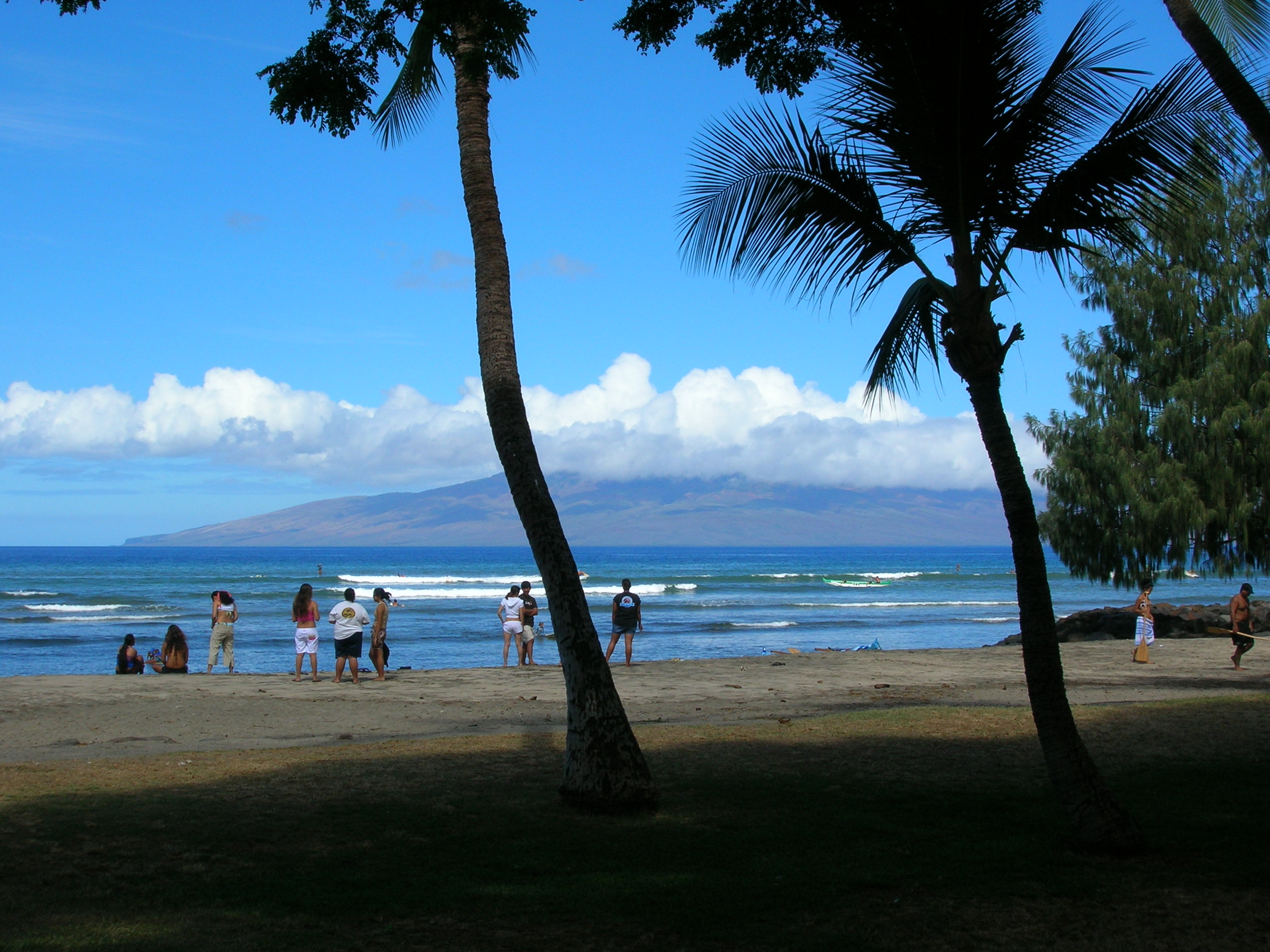

- Location within Hawaii
- Coordinates: 20°51′00″N 156°38′16″W
- Country: United States
- State: Hawaii
- County: Maui

Area
  - Total: 5.34 sq mi (13.82 km^{2})
  - Land: 5.33 sq mi (13.80 km^{2})
  - Water: 0.0077 sq mi (0.02 km^{2})
- Elevation: 522 ft (159 m)

Population (2020)
  - Total: 688
  - Density: 129.1/sq mi (49.85/km^{2})
- Time zone: UTC-10 (Hawaii-Aleutian)
- ZIP code: 96761
- Area code: 808
- GNIS feature ID: 361745

Launiupoko is an unincorporated community and census-designated place on the island of Maui in Maui County, Hawaii, United States. It is located on the west side of the island, along the coast between Lahaina to the immediate north and Olowalu slightly to the south. Its population was 688 as of the 2020 census.

Launiupoko Beach Park is located near the beach in the community, managed by the county of Maui. It is 6.7 acres in size, and is ADA accessible. There are sixteen picnic tables and ten barbecues, and 90 parking spots in total, with 50 of those being across the highway. It has one outdoor shower, one restroom, and two payphones.

== Geography ==
According to the U.S. Census Bureau, the community has an area of 5.333 square miles (13.81 km^{2}), of which 5.327 square miles (13.80 km^{2}) is land and 0.006 square miles (0.016 km^{2}) is water.

== Demographics ==
Historical population
Census	Pop.	Note	%±
2020	688		—
U.S. Decennial Census
