= Wailuku, Hawaii =

Wailuku
- Census-designated place
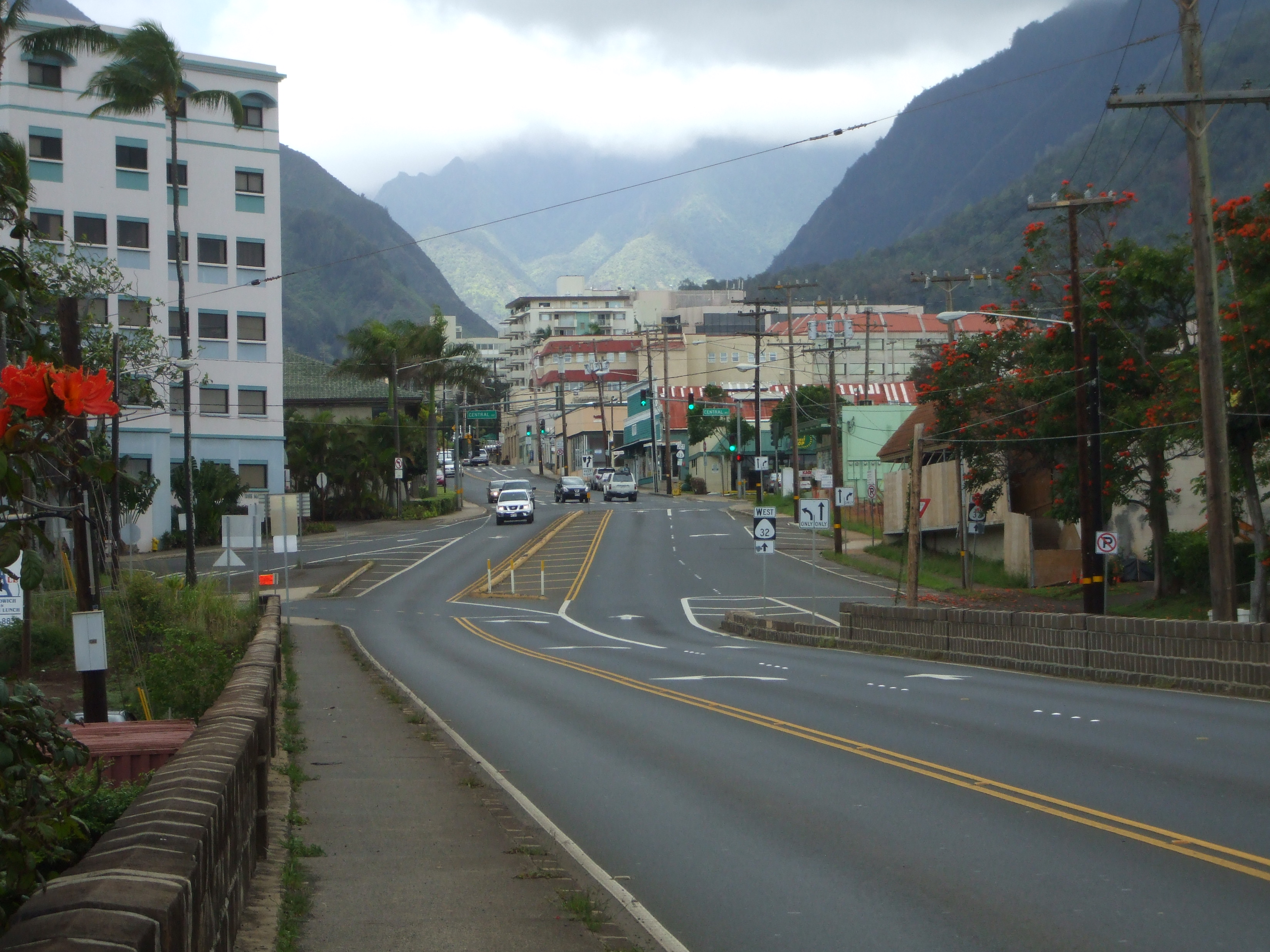
- Wailuku, looking from the Waiʻale Drive Bridge towards ʻĪao Valley.

- Location in Maui County and the state of Hawaii

- Location in Hawaii
- Coordinates: 20°53′31″N 156°30′8″W
- Country: United States
- State: Hawaii
- County: Maui

Area
  - Total: 5.67 sq mi (14.69 km^{2})
  - Land: 5.27 sq mi (13.64 km^{2})
  - Water: 0.41 sq mi (1.06 km^{2})
- Elevation: 249 ft (76 m)

Population (2020)
  - Total: 17,697
  - Density: 3,361.1/sq mi (1,297.71/km^{2})
- Time zone: UTC-10 (Hawaii-Aleutian)
- ZIP code: 96793
- Area code: 808
- FIPS code: 15-77450
- GNIS feature ID: 0364757

Wailuku is a census-designated place (CDP) in and county seat of Maui Island, Maui County, Hawaii, United States. The population was 17,697 at the 2020 census.

Wailuku is just west of Kahului, at the mouth of the ʻĪao Valley. In the early 20th century, Wailuku was Maui's main tourist destination. It has since been eclipsed by resort towns such as Kihei.

Historic sites in the town include Kaʻahumanu Church (named after Queen Kaʻahumanu, wife of Kamehameha I), which dates to 1876; the Wailuku Civic Center Historic District; the site of the Chee Kung Tong Society Building; and the Bailey House, a 19th-century former seminary and home that houses a history museum and the Maui Historical Society.

There are two ancient temples near Wailuku, called heiau—the Halekiʻi Heiau and the Pihanakalani Heiau. Both date back hundreds of years and were used for religious purposes by native Hawaiians.

Wailuku is served by Kahului Airport.

== Geography ==
The ancient (left) and the modern (right) district of Wailuku

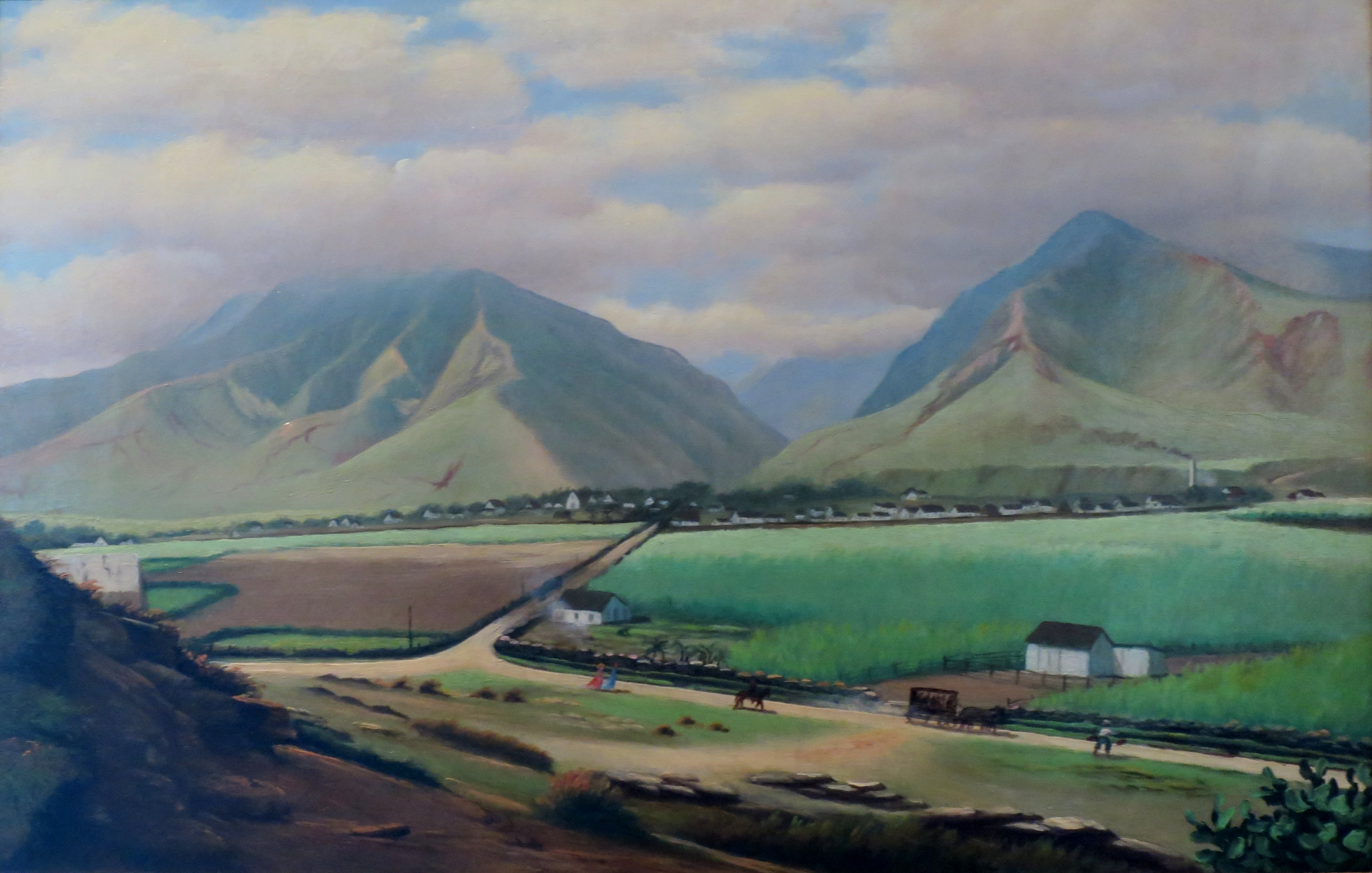
Pre-1903 Wailuku and ʻĪao Valley by 19th century American artist Edward Bailey

Wailuku is located at 20°53′31″N 156°30′8″W (20.891923, -156.502177) between the CDPs of Waihee-Waiehu to the north, Kahului to the east, and Waikapu to the south.

The town is 249 feet (76 m) above sea level, at the base of West Maui Volcano, known historically as Mauna Kahalawai and Hale Mahina, on the northern edge of the isthmus of East Maui (Haleakalā) and West Maui.

According to the United States Census Bureau, the CDP has an area of 5.7 square miles (14.8 km^{2}), of which 5.3 square miles (13.8 km^{2}) is land and 0.42 square miles (1.1 km^{2}), or 7.16%, is water.

The three moku or districts of west Maui are Lāhaina, Kāʻanapali, and Wailuku. Wailuku is also known as Pūʻalikomohana, or Nā Wai ʻEhā, which means "the four waters". The four waters are the ahupuaʻa (smaller land division than district), which are Waikapū, Wailuku, Waiʻehu, and Waiheʻe.

== History ==
Home to some of Maui's Hawaiian rulers, site of Kamehameha's 1790 victory at the Battle of Kepaniwai in the ʻĪao Valley, location of the 19th century Mission Station and birthplace of the sugar industry, Wailuku illustrates the influences that shaped the town, island, and state.

The area was a center of power and population in prehistoric Hawaii. The famous Wailuku chief was Wakalana. In the mid-1800s it was irrevocably changed when New England missionaries brought their religious beliefs, skills, implements, and agricultural methods. By the 1860s the Wailuku Sugar Company (owned by C. Brewer & Co.) and other plantations were busy growing and milling sugarcane. Miles of ditches were dug, bringing irrigation water from deep in the mountains to central Maui's vast fields, and the sugar industry flourished, to the detriment of the native people.

Thousands of skilled and unskilled workers immigrated to Maui to toil in the fields and factories. They came from China, Japan, Okinawa, Korea, the Philippines, Europe, and America – bringing ethnic, cultural and religious diversity to their new home. Many settled in Wailuku, where houses, schools, churches, temples, shops, banks and community buildings were built to meet the thriving company town's needs.

In 1905, Wailuku was designated Maui's county seat, and it soon became a hub of government, business, and entertainment, with vaudeville and movie theatres, a bowling alley, hotels, a poi factory, ice and soda works, and many markets and offices. Thus began the era of growth that continued until the late 1960s when the sugar industry, losing its economic prosperity, reduced operations and the development of alternative commercial centers drew business away from downtown Wailuku. In the 1990s, the former C. Brewer land was developed into the Kehalani neighborhood.

Many private and public buildings have architectural and historical significance. Beyond this stylish neighborhood are the narrow lanes where modest bungalows and colorful gardens preserve the flavor of old Wailuku. On upper Main Street (the road to ʻĪao Valley) are remnants of the missionary era. A tiny graveyard contains tombstones of Hawaiian Aliʻi (royalty) and missionary families. Further uphill are the Alexander House and Bailey House, now a museum displaying ancient Hawaiian artifacts and missionary period rooms, and office of the Maui Historical Society. Atop Vineyard Street is a cemetery with views of the ʻĪao Valley and West Maui Mountains.

"Wailuku" means "destroying water." The Hawaiian god Kāne is considered the procreator and provider of life. He is associated with wai (fresh water) as well as clouds, rain, streams and springs. Kanaloa, the Hawaiian god of the underworld, is represented by the phallic stone of the ʻĪao Needle.

Kapawa, the king of Hawaiʻi before Pili, was buried here. In the late 15th century, Maui's ruler Kakaʻe designated ʻĪao Valley as an aliʻi burial ground. The remains were buried in secret places. In 1790, the Battle of Kepaniwai took place there, in which Kamehameha the Great defeated Kalanikūpule and the Maui army during his campaign to unify the islands. The battle was said to be so bloody that dead bodies blocked ʻĪao Stream, and the battle site was named Kepaniwai ("the damming of the waters").

== Demographics ==
Historical population
Census	Pop.	Note	%±
2000	12,296		—
2010	15,313		24.5%
2020	17,697		15.6%
U.S. Decennial Census

=== 2020 census ===
As of the 2020 census, Wailuku had a population of 17,697. The median age was 42.3 years. 22.3% of residents were under the age of 18 and 18.8% of residents were 65 years of age or older. For every 100 females there were 97.1 males, and for every 100 females age 18 and over there were 94.0 males age 18 and over.

99.9% of residents lived in urban areas, while 0.1% lived in rural areas.

There were 6,354 households in Wailuku, of which 33.3% had children under the age of 18 living in them. Of all households, 46.6% were married-couple households, 18.7% were households with a male householder and no spouse or partner present, and 25.3% were households with a female householder and no spouse or partner present. About 25.5% of all households were made up of individuals and 11.4% had someone living alone who was 65 years of age or older.

There were 6,850 housing units, of which 7.2% were vacant. The homeowner vacancy rate was 1.0% and the rental vacancy rate was 5.0%.

Racial composition as of the 2020 census
Race	Number	Percent
White	3,900	22.0%
Black or African American	135	0.8%
American Indian and Alaska Native	97	0.5%
Asian	5,470	30.9%
Native Hawaiian and Other Pacific Islander	2,411	13.6%
Some other race	327	1.8%
Two or more races	5,357	30.3%
Hispanic or Latino (of any race)	2,040	11.5%

=== 2000 census ===
As of the census of 2000, there were 12,296 people, 4,535 households, and 3,015 families residing in the CDP. The population density was 2,427.4 inhabitants per square mile (937.2/km^{2}). There were 4,780 housing units at an average density of 943.6 per square mile (364.3/km^{2}). The racial makeup of the CDP was 8.16% White, 0.24% African American, 0.36% Native American, 42.08% Asian, 11.70% Pacific Islander, 1.18% from other races, and 26.28% from two or more races. Hispanic or Latino of any race were 7.75% of the population.

There were 4,535 households, out of which 29.1% had children under the age of 18 living with them, 48.4% were married couples living together, 12.7% had a female householder with no husband present, and 33.5% were non-families. 25.7% of all households were made up of individuals, and 8.2% had someone living alone who was 65 years of age or older. The average household size was 2.71 and the average family size was 3.28.

In the CDP the population was spread out, with 23.7% under the age of 18, 7.1% from 18 to 24, 30.3% from 25 to 44, 23.9% from 45 to 64, and 15.1% who were 65 years of age or older. The median age was 38 years. For every 100 females, there were 99.4 males. For every 100 females age 18 and over, there were 97.0 males.

The median income for a household in the CDP was $45,587, and the median income for a family was $51,441. Males had a median income of $33,429 versus $26,487 for females. The per capita income for the CDP was $20,503. About 8.1% of families and 11.2% of the population were below the poverty line, including 14.7% of those under age 18 and 3.8% of those age 65 or over.

== Economy ==
Major employers in Wailuku include Towne Island Homes, Maui Memorial Medical Center, Kaiser Permanente, Maui County, the Pacific Whale Foundation, Maui Ocean Center, The Maui News, Maui Community Correctional Center, and Bayada Home Health Care.

== Education ==
The statewide school district of Hawaii is the Hawaii State Department of Education.

The Hawaii State Public Library System operates the Wailuku Public Library.

== Sports ==
Wailuku is the birthplace of two former Major League Baseball players, Shane Victorino and Kurt Suzuki. Both were members of World Series champion teams; Victorino in 2008 and 2013, and Suzuki in 2019. From 2010 to 2013, Wailuku was home to its own baseball team, Na Koa Ikaika Maui.

The Maui Bowling Center, which has hosted a strong number of local bowling leagues since its grand opening in 1948, is located in Wailuku. The alley utilized manual pin-setters from its opening until 1961, when it converted to automatic setting machines.

== Points of interest ==
- ʻIao Theater
- ʻĪao Valley
- Tropical Gardens of Maui
- Duke "The Duke" Kahanamoku's (Ambassador of Aloha) Surfboard at The Bailey House Museum
