= ʻŌpaekaʻa Road Bridge =

Historic place in Hawaii, United States

- U.S. National Register of Historic Places
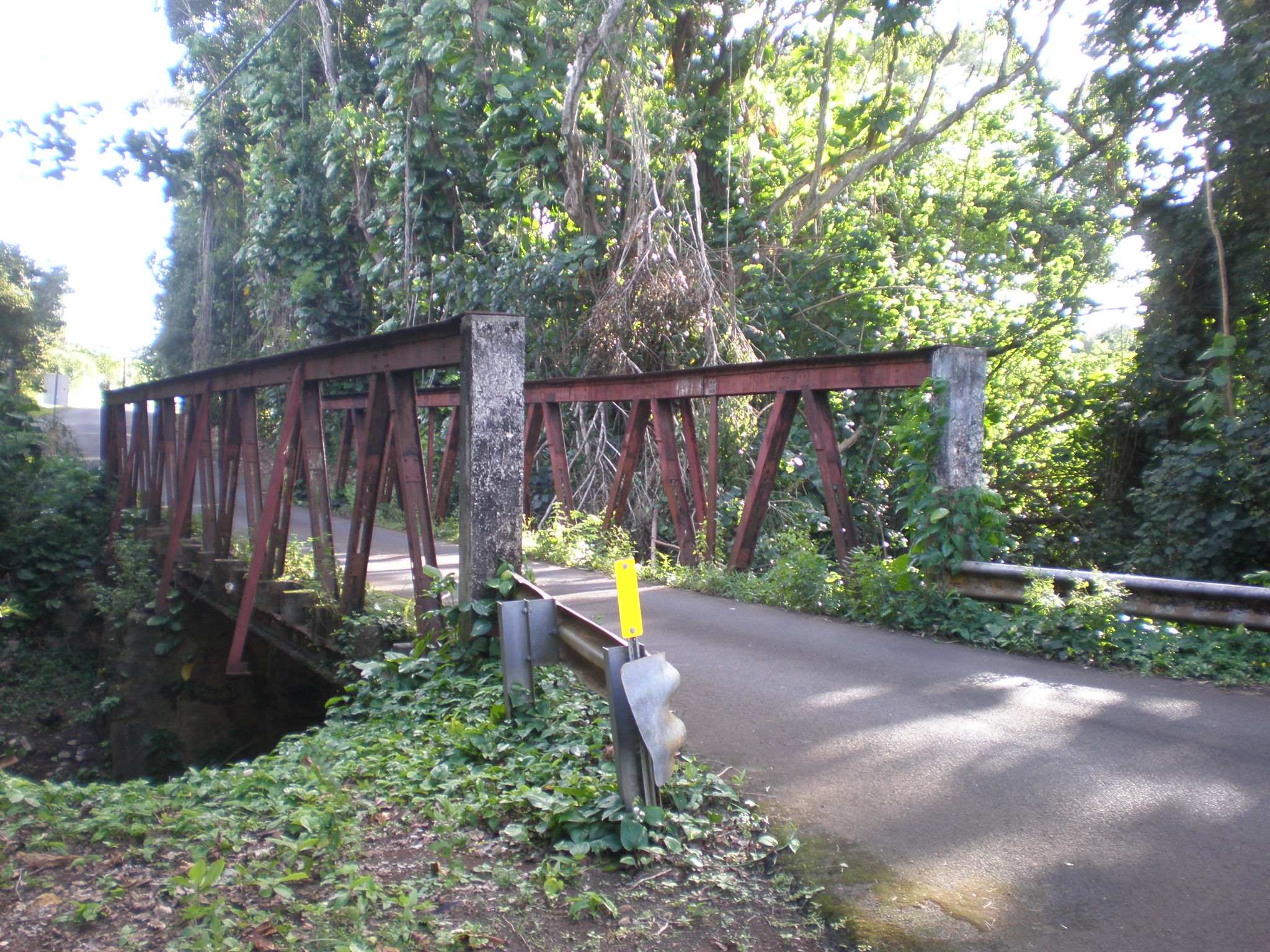
- The bridge in 2009

- Location within Hawaii
- Location: Kapaʻa, Hawaii
- Coordinates: 22°3′31″N 159°22′41″W
- Built: 1890, 1895, 1919
- Architect: Joseph H. Moragne
- NRHP reference No.: 83000253
- Added to NRHP: March 28, 1983

The ʻŌpaekaʻa Road Bridge is a steel truss bridge listed on the National Register of Historic Places located along ʻŌpaekaʻa Road in the Wailua Homesteads neighborhood of Kapaʻa, on the island of Kauaʻi, in the state of Hawaii, United States. The one-lane bridge spans ʻŌpaekaʻa Stream. With steel beams forged in 1890 by the Alexander Findlay & Company in Motherwell, Scotland, this is touted as possibly the only British-built bridge located in the United States.

== History ==
The steel supports for this bridge were originally forged in 1890 and utilized as part of the Wailua River Bridge. Constructed as a three span, steel truss bridge, its construction was delayed through 1894 due to the overthrow of the Hawaiian Kingdom and the establishment of the Republic of Hawaii. When this span was replaced in 1919, the steel was reused in the construction of the present-day bridge over ʻOpaekaʻa Stream. Its relocation was carried out by then County Engineer Joseph Moragne.

Today, the largest span has a length of 33.1 feet (10.1 m), a total length of 74.2 feet (22.6 m) and a deck width of 12.5 feet (3.8 m). Having an average daily traffic of 382 vehicles as of 1986, the bridge is maintained by the Kauaʻi County Division of Roads. With a sufficiency rating of only 14.7 percent and substandard safety railing, this span is listed as structurally deficient and past the point of rehabilitation, necessitating the need for a replacement span for the crossing.

As a result of its age and exposure, many of its steel beams are rusted through, with much of its concrete deck cracked in multiple locations. Due to its deteriorating state its rated load was reduced to 5 tons in 2007, then to 3 tons, and is listed to be replaced as part of the Hawaii Department of Transportation's current statewide transportation improvement program.
