= Puʻuʻōpae Bridge =

- U.S. National Register of Historic Places
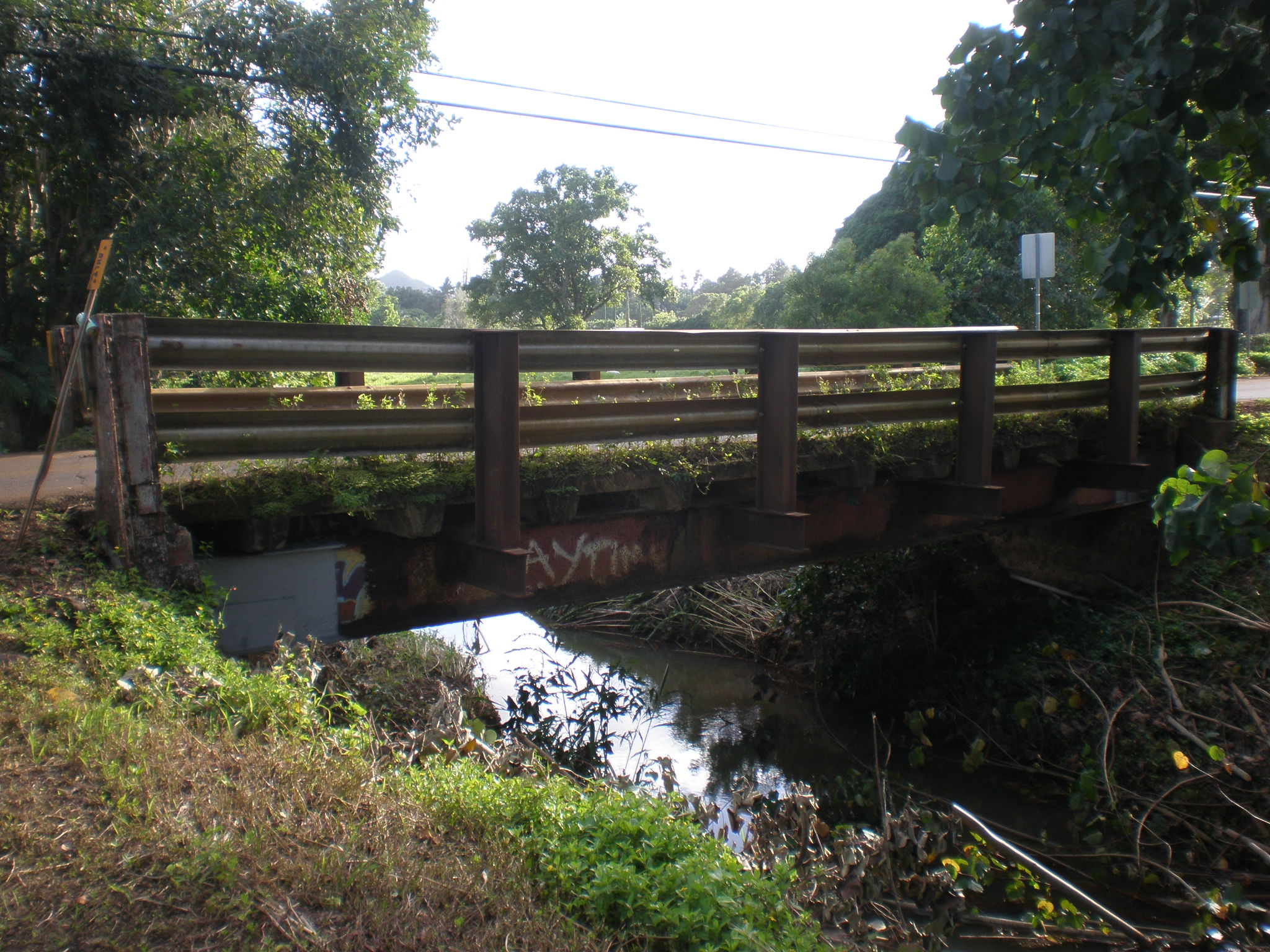
- The bridge in 2009

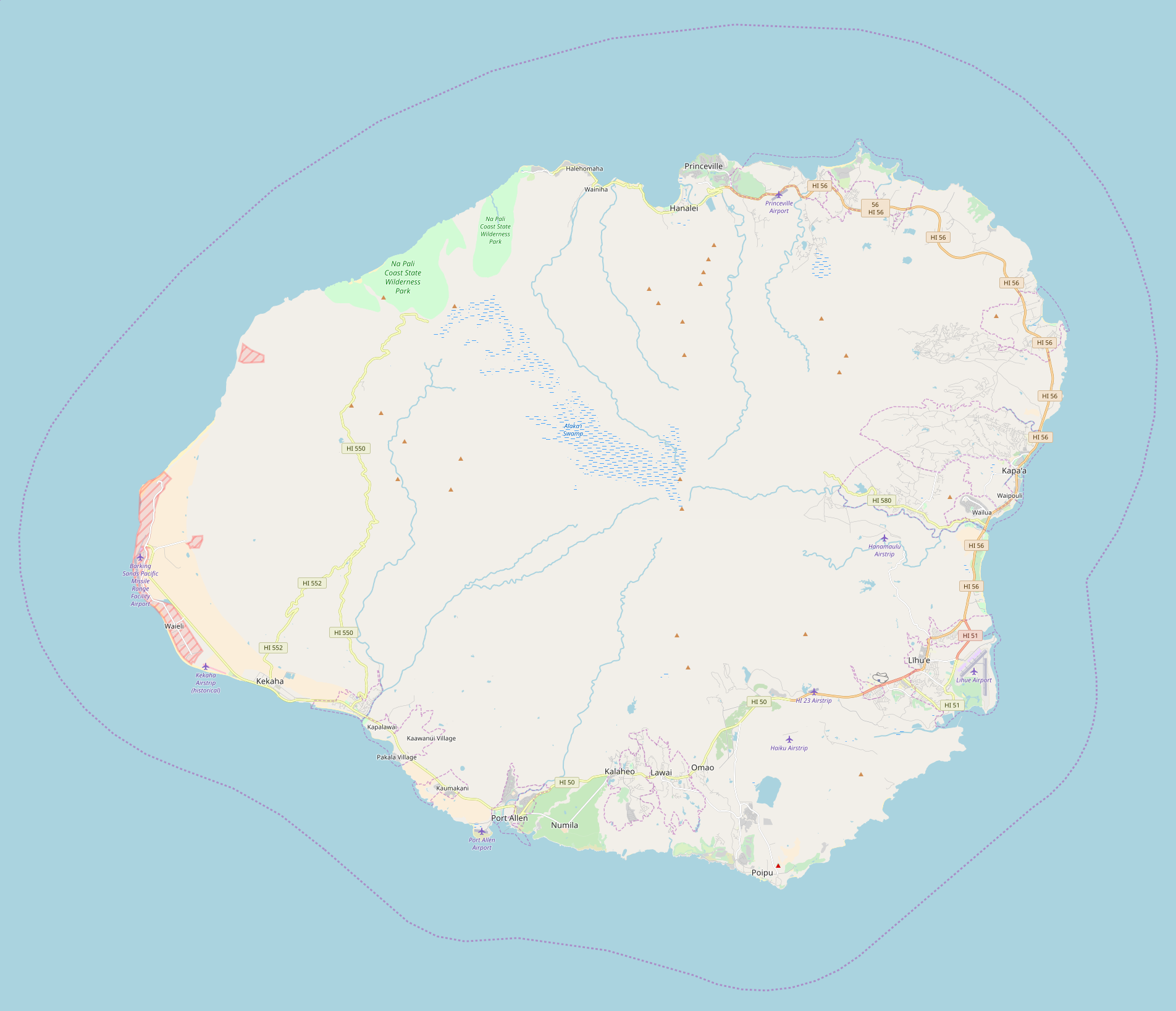
- Location within Kauai Location within Hawaii
- Location: Kapaʻa, Hawaiʻi
- Coordinates: 22°4′6″N 159°22′23″W
- Area: less than one acre
- Built: 1915
- Architect: Joseph H. Moragne
- NRHP reference No.: 05000536
- Added to NRHP: May 25, 2005

The Puʻuʻōpae Bridge (also known as Kalama Stream Bridge and Kapaʻa Homesteads Bridge #2) is a one-lane, single-span, concrete-encased steel bridge across Kalama Stream located along Puʻuʻōpae Road between Kalama and Kīpapa Roads in the Wailua Homesteads area near Kapaʻa in Kauaʻi, Hawaiʻi, United States. Originally built in 1915, it was listed on the National Register of Historic Places in 2005.

The design of the bridge is of little significance. Its endposts appear to have come from materials dismantled from the old Wailua River Bridge in 1919, and its original trusses were removed during repair work in 1958. It is currently in poor condition and may have to be replaced, rather than restored, according to Kauaʻi County Engineer Donald Fujimoto. It is listed on the Hawaii Department of Transportation's current statewide transportation improvement schedule.

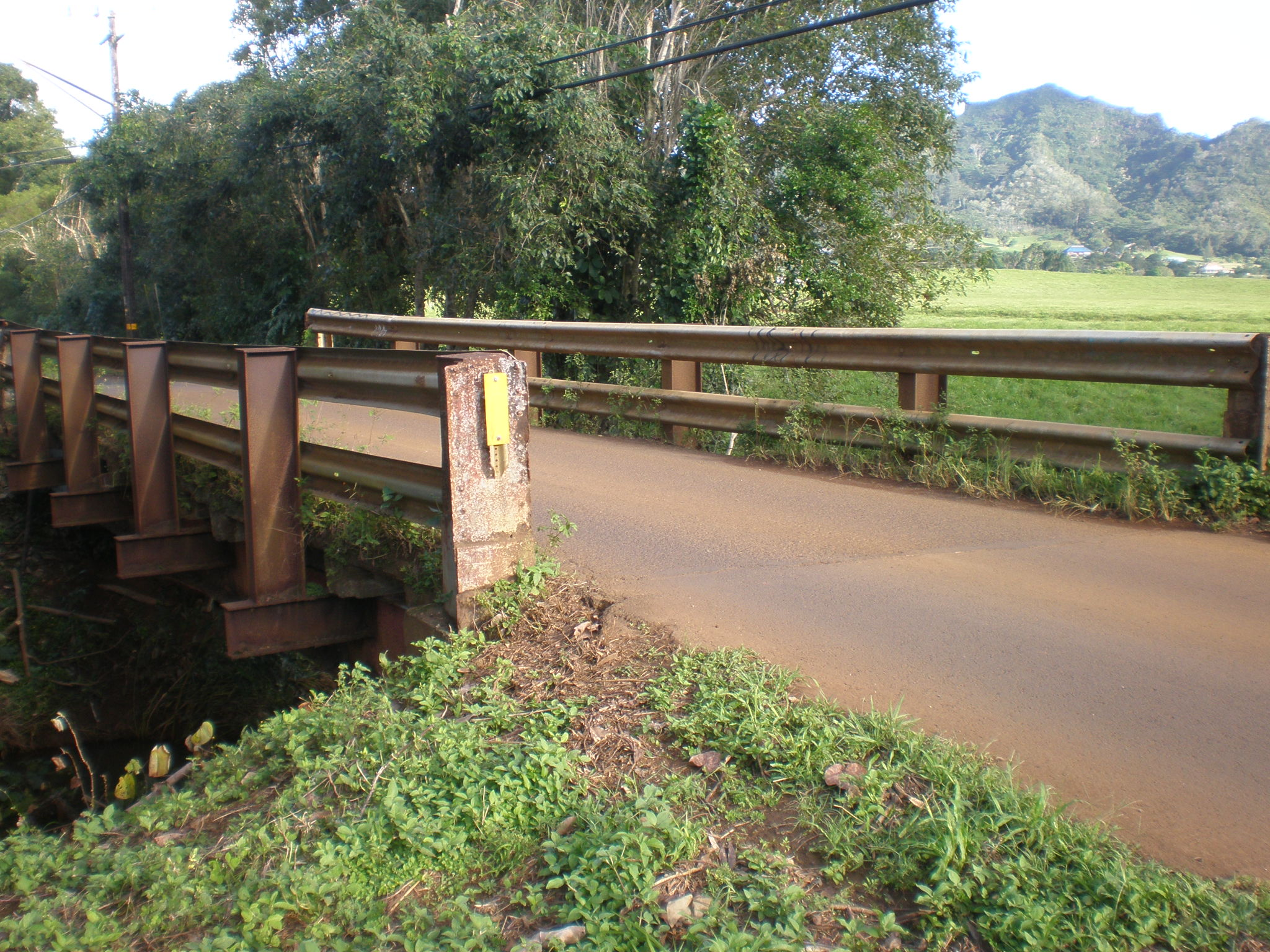
Bridge and neighboring pasture land

Much more significant is its role in the socioeconomic history of the island. It was built to facilitate access to the Kapaʻa uplands, which had been opened to homesteaders two years earlier. When Hawaiʻi became a United States Territory in 1900, most of its land was held in very few hands, primarily those of large-scale sugar planters and the government itself. Despite being dominated by the sugar industry, the territorial government sought to encourage the growth of family farms by opening up large tracts of its own land to homesteaders. The best coastal plains were already devoted to sugarcane plantations, so homestead lands on Kauaʻi were located in the uplands of Kapaʻa on the east side of the island and Kalāheo on the southeast side.

The Puʻuʻōpae Bridge was designed to serve tracts of land along Olohena and Waipouli Roads known as Kapaʻa Homesteads 2nd Series, which included 81 lots ranging from roughly 20 to 40 acres, on which 90 homesteaders harvested 31,500 tons of sugarcane by 1917, despite poor roads, limited water, and dependence on the large plantations for milling and marketing their sugar. Although most of the homestead plots have subsequently been rezoned as residential, the nearly 400 acres surrounding this bridge remain the only significant expanse of agricultural land in the region.

"The history of the Kapa'a Homesteads ... is not the product of a single Great Man who shaped the area but the collective story of a group of settlers who struggled to make a life as independent farmers for themselves and their families. The names of the 1913 Kapa'a Homesteads lottery winners hints at a predominance of the Hawaiian and Caucasian settlers who bought into the homesteading idea, but people from other backgrounds were represented as well: Lino, Contrades, Kauai, Hanohano, Kaui, Kainoa, Kelekoma, Booge, French, Miyashi, Souza, Reis, Wilson, Tracy, Johonnot, Silva, Konda, Nasahiga, Hepa, Reichelt, Soto, Cummings, Louis, Achuck, Cheatham, Livesey, Israel, Cook, Jensen, Ferreira, Victorino, Barreta, Rapoza, Aroong, Ohai, Waiwaiole, Mailehuna, Rodrigues, Amalu, Kaiu, Ventura, Kikaahu."
