= Māʻalaea, Hawaii =

Māʻalaea
- Census-designated place
- Location in Maui County and the state of Hawaii
- Coordinates: 20°48′34″N 156°29′27″W
- Country: United States
- State: Hawaii
- County: Maui

Area
  - Total: 7.49 sq mi (19.39 km^{2})
  - Land: 5.15 sq mi (13.35 km^{2})
  - Water: 2.33 sq mi (6.04 km^{2})
- Elevation: 98 ft (30 m)

Population (2020)
  - Total: 310
  - Density: 60.1/sq mi (23.22/km^{2})
- Time zone: UTC-10 (Hawaii-Aleutian)
- Area code: 808
- FIPS code: 15-46400
- GNIS feature ID: 0361945

Māʻalaea is a census-designated place (CDP) in Maui County, Hawaii, United States. The population was 310 at the 2020 census. Māʻalaea sits on the southern coast of the isthmus separating West Maui from the island’s Central Valley. Like other ahupua‘a (Hawaiian land divisions), it widens as it descends from mountain slopes into the sea, occupying 5.4 square miles of land and 2.3 miles of ocean. For more than a millennium, Māʻalaea has been a crossroads, a landing place for Hawaiian kings and armies, and in time, whalers and sailing ships. Highways follow the ancient trails that once branched north to Wailuku (today Maui County’s governmental seat), west to Lahaina, and south to what are now the towns of Kīhei and Wailea. The name Māʻalaea comes from the Hawaiian word ‘alae, the iron oxide from volcanic eruptions that gives the region its iron-rich red earth.

== Geography ==
Māʻalaea is located at 20°48′34″N 156°29′27″W (20.809336, -156.490729).

According to the United States Census Bureau, the CDP has a total area of 7.8 square miles (20.1 km^{2}), of which 5.4 square miles (14.1 km^{2}) is land and 2.3 square miles (6.0 km^{2}), or 29.99%, is water.

== Māʻalaea History ==
The site of a 15th century fishing village, Māʻalaea was home to a massive heiau (ceremonial site), petroglyphs, kauhale (dwellings) and ko‘a (fishing shrines), some of which remain on the hillsides above. For the region’s earliest inhabitants, Kapoli Spring, near the present-day harbor, was the main source of fresh water in this sometimes arid land.

On January 20, 1778, Captain James Cook and the crew of H.M.S. Endeavor became the first westerners to set foot in Hawai‘i. The decades that followed saw an ever-increasing population of missionaries, seafarers, adventurers, merchants and tradesmen from around the globe. By the late 1800s, Māʻalaea had become a major destination for travelers to Maui. A detailed 1883 map of Māʻalaea Bay shows a wharf, a hotel and cafe, a boathouse and more.

After the 1893 overthrow of Hawai‘i’s last queen, Liliuokalani, westerners turned former kingdom lands into vast sugar and pineapple plantations. Many of the Chinese, Japanese, Portuguese and other immigrants they recruited to work in the fields remained in the islands after finishing their contracts, contributing to Hawai‘i’s multicultural society.

A small fishing village sprang up in Māʻalaea; the 1910 census showed it populated mostly by Japanese (32 individuals) and 7 Hawaiians. That same year, the Maui Dry Goods Company opened a general store in Māʻalaea, and by 1918, a local Japanese named Yosabaru Tsuboi had acquired the business, expanding it to include a popular fish market that featured the wares of the local fishing fleet. The majority of crews on Hawai‘i’s fishing boats were of Japanese ancestry; in Māʻalaea, they carved the likeness of the Shinto god Ebisu-Sama, the protective deity of fishermen. The statue and shrine remain in the village to this day. So does the Māʻalaea General Store, a Maui landmark that is still open today—and listed on the National Historic Register.

In 1929, a World War I Navy pilot named Stanley C. Kennedy constructed Maui’s first airport: a 1,500-foot-long landing field in Māʻalaea for his newly formed Inter-Island Airways. That year, two Sikorsky amphibian planes, holding eight passengers each, flew from Honolulu to Maui in 59 minutes. With flights between Maui and O‘ahu, Lāna‘i and Moloka‘i, Māʻalaea was once again a crossroads for travelers.

The years leading up to World War II brought surfers to Māʻalaea Bay. Among them is the “Māʻalaea Freight Train.” It’s considered one of the world’s fastest rideable waves, but only occurs under the right conditions.

A dozen years later, as World War II raged in Europe, the U.S. Navy sailed 130 ships into Hawaiian waters, and in the months following the Imperial Japanese Navy’s attack on Pearl Harbor, sent thousands of Marines to Maui. The Fourth Marine Division set up training areas along the island’s leeward coast and put Māʻalaea’s mudflats to use for live-fire exercises and a demolition training camp for underwater teams, preparing them for the conditions they would find on Iwo Jima, Saipan and Tinian. The Marines who had trained at Māʻalaea went on to defeat the Japanese Army’s 43rd Infantry Division on Saipan. Relics from the Marines’ training exercises still lie submerged off Māʻalaea Bay.

During the war, thousands of Japanese living in America, many of them citizens, were sent to internment camps on the U.S. mainland. In the predominantly Japanese village of Māʻalaea, Keizo Ban, manager of Kīhei General Store, was the first to be arrested. Another was Reverend Masao Arine, who held services at Māʻalaea’s Ebisoku Jinsha shrine.

In the 1950s, Hawai‘i’s economy began a decades-long shift from sugar and pineapple to tourism. The Hale Kini O Maalaea Polynesian Motel opened in 1956, five years after the Territory’s Department of Public Works completed the Lahaina Pali (cliff) Tunnel above Māʻalaea Village, linking Maui’s Central Valley with Lahaina. As the island’s fledgling visitor industry emerged, so did Māʻalaea small-boat harbor as a launching place for recreational vessels and commercial fishing boats. In 1968, the Coast Guard started stationing its cutter Cape Newagen there. A year later, Hollywood’s Mirisch Productions came to Māʻalaea to film The Hawaiians. Based on the James Michener book, the movie starred Charlton Heston and Geraldine Chaplin.

By the 1980s, big ideas were in the air for the village and its environs: a national marine sanctuary for humpback whales, a much-debated harbor expansion, and commercial centers. These and many more proposed projects led to the creation of the Ma‘alaea Community Association in 1988. In its twenty-eight years, the MCA’s long list of initiatives and projects left a lasting legacy in the community.

More changes came to Māʻalaea in the 1990s. The establishment of the Maui Ocean Center, the Pacific Whale Foundation’s headquarters and Māʻalaea Village Shops would transform the quaint village into a must-see visitor attraction. In 1992, President George H. W. Bush signed into law the Oceans Act that established the Hawaiian Islands Humpback Whale National Marine Sanctuary. A second refuge opened at Māʻalaea’s Keālia Pond, protecting the endangered Hawaiian stilt, Hawaiian coot, Hawaiian monk seal, and two species of Hawaiian sea turtles.

In 1994, the state’s new trails program, Nā Ala Hele, began restoring the serpentine Lahaina Pali Trail, connecting Lahaina and Māʻalaea along slopes containing 18 historic sites, including ancient rock walls and petroglyphs. The MCA ceased activities in 2016, and was replaced the next year by the newly incorporated Māʻalaea Village Association, whose purpose, in part, is to protect the region’s environment, from its upland watershed to its coastal waters.

== Demographics ==
Historical population
| Census | Pop. | Note | %± |
|---|---|---|---|
| 2010 | 352 | | — |
| 2020 | 310 | | −11.9% |
U.S. Decennial Census

=== 2010 census ===
As of the census of 2010, there were 352 people, 196 households, and 81 families residing in the CDP. The population density is 45 people per square mile (17 people/km^{2}). The racial makeup of the CDP was 78.1% White, 2% African American, 0.3% Native American, 9.7% Asian, 5.4% Pacific Islander, 1.1% from other races, and 3.4% from two or more races. Hispanic or Latino of any race were 3.7% of the population.

There were 196 households, out of which 3.6% had children under the age of 18 living with them, 37.2% were married couples living together, 2.6% had a female householder with no husband present, and 58.7% were non-families. 51% of all households were single individuals and 42.3% had someone living alone who was 65 years of age or older. The average household size was 1.56 and the average family size was 2.15.

In the CDP the population was spread out, with 4.5% under the age of 18, 2.8% from 18 to 24, 15.3% from 25 to 44, 44.6% from 45 to 64, and 22.9% who were 65 years of age or older. The median age was 59 years. For every 100 females, there were 114 males. For every 100 females age 18 and over, there were 135 males.

The median income for a household in the CDP was $73,083, and the median income for a family was $101,250. Males had a median income of $53,750 versus $72,708 for females. The per capita income for the CDP was $53,152. About 2.3% of families and 9.7% of the population were below the poverty line, including 16.7% of those under age 18 and 7.2% of those age 65 or over.

=== 2020 census ===
There were 310 people, 561 housing units, and 148 housing units in the CDP. There were 220 White people, 5 African Americans, 0 Native Americans, 27 Asians, 16 Pacific Islanders, 5 people from some other race, and 37 people from two or more races. There were 24 people of Hispanic or Latino origin.

The ancestry was 18.8% English, 17% German, 9.4% Irish, 5.4% French, 3.6% Polish, 3.1% Italian, 3.1% Scottish, and 1.8% Norwegian.

The median age was 63 years old. 43.5% of the population were 65 or older, with 28.7% between the ages of 65 to 74, 13.5% between the ages of 75 to 84, and 1.3% 85 or older. 12.1% of the population were veterans.

The median household income was $91,250, with families having $138,125, married couples having $140,625, and non-families having $61,563. 6.3% of the population were in poverty.

== Gallery ==
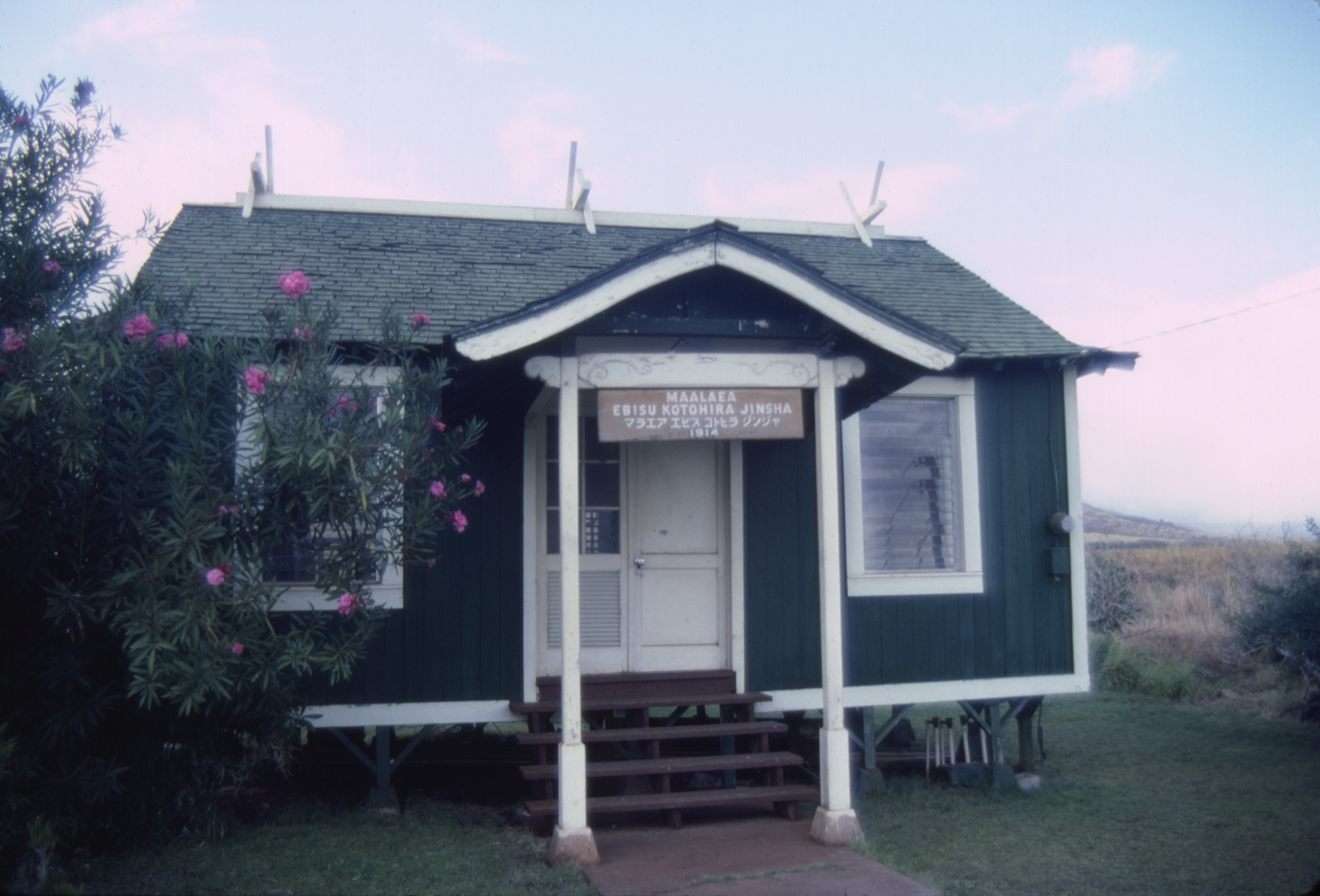
Māʻalaea Ebisu Kotohira Jinsha in Māʻalaea. Photograph by Alan Gowans. Department of Image Collections, National Gallery of Art Library.
