= Ohana by Hawaiian =

Regional carrier owned by Hawaiian Airlines

IATA	ICAO	Call sign
--	CFS	EMPIRE
- Founded: 2013
- Commenced operations: March 11, 2014
- Ceased operations: May 27, 2021
- Operating bases: Daniel K. Inouye International Airport (Honolulu)
- Focus cities: Kapalua; Lanai; Molokai
- Fleet size: 7
- Destinations: 4
- Parent company: Hawaiian Airlines
- Headquarters: Honolulu, Hawaii, United States
- Website: www.hawaiianairlines.com

ʻOhana by Hawaiian was a regional subsidiary carrier of Hawaiian Airlines. The service was operated using four ATR 42 turboprop airplanes owned by Hawaiian and operated under contract by Empire Airlines. The new service was slated to begin in summer 2013 initially flying to Moloka'i and Lana'i; however, the airline was unable to begin operations during that period because of Federal Aviation Administration delays in certifying ʻOhana's operation. During its time of operation, ʻOhana by Hawaiian was fully integrated into the Hawaiian Airlines network.

On May 27, 2021, Hawaiian announced that 'Ohana by Hawaiian would be discontinued after the COVID-19 pandemic forced the shuttering of the carrier's operations. All of its fleet will be sold and existing employees working under Hawaiian will be reassigned elsewhere.

== History ==
In February 2014, Hawaiian announced that ʻOhana would begin service on March 11. On June 12, 2014, ʻOhana by Hawaiian announced it would expand its route network to Maui, offering daily flights between Kahului, Maui and Moloka'i; Kahului and Kona, Hawai'i Island; and Kahului and Hilo.

In July 2015, Hawaiian announced that Empire Airlines would begin all cargo freighter service on interisland routes in Hawaii with ATR 72 turboprop aircraft as part of the ʻOhana by Hawaiian service. Freighter operation began in March 2018 after the acquisition of ATR 72-200(F) aircraft.

During the COVID-19 pandemic, ʻOhana began reducing its operations. On March 25, 2020, ʻOhana suspended service to and from Kapalua as a part of its first round of interisland schedule reductions. Beginning November 1, 2020, ʻOhana paused passenger service to Lanai and Molokai and all interisland cargo service, citing a clause in their contracts with Hawaiian pilots that stated ʻOhana flights could not be operated if interisland flights operated by Hawaiian's Boeing 717 and Airbus A321 aircraft were significantly reduced as well. Passenger service to Lanai and Molokai was eventually discontinued on January 14, 2021, effectively suspending the carrier's operations.

On May 27, 2021, Hawaiian announced that it would discontinue the ʻOhana brand and service after the pandemic and resulting quarantine significantly impacted interisland travel. The interruptions in service forced the airline to reconsider the viability of operation and determine it was no longer feasible. The carrier's ATR fleet would be moved to the mainland and be prepared for sale.

== Former destinations ==
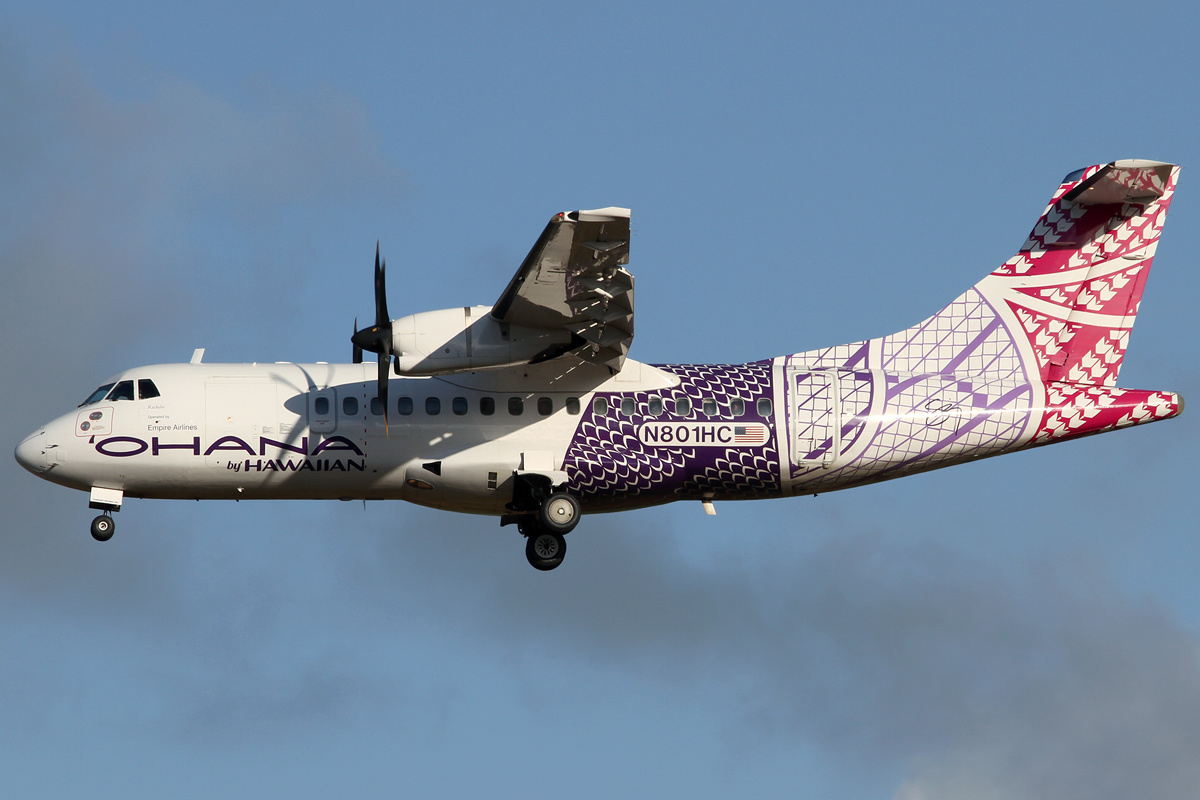
An ʻOhana by Hawaiian ATR 42-500 approaching Kahului Airport

ʻOhana by Hawaiian served the following destinations:

City	State	ICAO code	Airport
Hilo	Hawaii	PHTO	Hilo International Airport
Honolulu	Hawaii	PHNL	Daniel K. Inouye International Airport
Kahului	Hawaii	PHOG	Kahului Airport
Kailua-Kona	Hawaii	PHKO	Kona International Airport
Kapalua	Hawaii	PHJH	Kapalua Airport
Lanai	Hawaii	PHNY	Lanai Airport
Lihue	Hawaii	PHLI	Lihue Airport
Molokai	Hawaii	PHMK	Molokai Airport

Cargo flights were flown between Honolulu and Hilo, Kahului, Kona, and Lihue.

== Former fleet ==
ʻOhana by Hawaiian
Aircraft	In service	Passengers	Notes
ATR 42-500	4	48	
ATR 72-212F	3	Cargo	
Total	7		

== See also ==
- List of airlines of Hawaii
