= List of airlines of Hawaii =

The following is a list of airlines that are based in the U.S. state of Hawaii.

== Current airlines ==
=== Passenger ===
| Airline | IATA | ICAO | Image | Callsign | Commenced operations |
|---|---|---|---|---|---|
| Hawaiian Airlines | HA | ASA | | ALASKA | 1929 |
| Mokulele Airlines | 9X | FDY | | FRIENDLY | 1994 |

=== Cargo ===
| Airline | IATA | ICAO | Image | Callsign | Commenced operations |
|---|---|---|---|---|---|
| Aloha Air Cargo | KH | AAH | | ALOHA | 2008 |
| Trans Executive Airlines | R9 | MUI | | RHOADES EXPRESS | 1982 |

== Defunct airlines ==
| Airline | IATA | ICAO | Image | Callsign | Commenced operations | Ceased operations |
|---|---|---|---|---|---|---|
| Aloha Airlines | AQ | AAH | | ALOHA | 1946 | 2008 |
| Discovery Airways | DH | DVA | | DISCOVERY AIRWAYS | 1989 | 1990 |
| FlyHawaii Airlines | | | | | 2005 | 2006 |
| Go! | YV | ASH | | AIR SHUTTLE | 2005 | 2014 |
| Go! Mokulele | YV | ASH | | AIR SHUTTLE | 2009 | 2012 |
| Hawaiian Air Tour Service | | | | | 1965 | 1967 |
| Island Air | WP | MKU | | MOKU | 1980 | 2017 |
| Mahalo Air | 8M | MLH | | MAHLO | 1993 | 1997 |
| Mid Pacific Air | HO | MPA | | MID PAC | 1981 | 1995 |
| Ohana by Hawaiian | | CFS | | EMPIRE | 2013 | 2021 |
| Pacific Wings | LW | NMI | | TSUNAMI | 1974 | 2014 |
