= Fairway Shops =

- Storefronts at Fairway Shops, 2016
- Location: Kāʻanapali, Hawaii, United States
- Coordinates: 20.9262°N 156.6905°W
- Address: 2580 Keka'a Drive
- Opened: 2001
- Manager: Colliers International
- Owner: Gutman Realty LLC
- Num. of stores: 21
- Floor area: 34,980 square feet (3,200 m^{2})
- Floors: 1
- Parking: 213 stalls
- Website: www.fairwayshops.com

Fairway Shops is an outdoor shopping mall located in Ka'anapali, a neighborhood of Lahaina, Hawaii. The stretch of shops was completed in 2001 and encompasses approximately 34,980 square feet (3,200 m^{2}) of retail space over three acres of land. The land of the center is owned by Gutman Realty LLC and managed by Colliers International. Of the tenants that occupy the complex, a majority of them are small businesses and local companies; a local urgent care center has since opened at the property.

== Background and location ==
Fairway Shops opened in 2001 as an outdoor shopping mall situated on approximately three acres of land. It consists of 34,980 square feet (3,200 m^{2}) of retail space, with a total of 21 available tenants. It was reported in April 2015 that Jupiter Holdings LLC, the original owner of the mall, placed the property for sale. However, Gutman Realty LLC would remain as the sole landowner. Fairway Shops is currently managed by the Hawaiian branch of Canada-based real estate agency Colliers International.

The shopping complex is located near the Maui Eldorado resort in Ka'anapali, a neighborhood of Lahaina, Hawaii. Sometimes referred to as a strip mall, it is directly off the Honoapi'ilani Highway in the northern section of the Ka'anapali Beach Resort. Several of the hotels and condominiums within the surrounding area offer a complimentary shuttle service to Fairway Shops. Additionally, a shuttle service (the Kaanapali Trolley) stops at the shopping mall every hour to transport visitors to and around the community.

== Tenants ==
A majority of the occupants at Fairway Shops are small businesses and regionally owned operations, such as Artistic Nails & Spa, Sangrita Grill and Cantina, and Valley Isle Fitness. One of the first tenants to lease space at the center was CJ's Comfort Zone Deli, an independently-ran sandwich café that opened in 2003. Owner CJ Jorgensen wanted to incorporated ideas from his grandmother's cooking in addition with "international flair". West Maui's urgent care center is also located at the mall. In 2016, Keller Williams Realty's KW Island Living opened its fourth location in Maui, becoming the newest tenant at Fairway Shops as they prepared for a merger with Lahaina-based Whalers Realty, Inc. The center is currently at a 97% occupancy rate.
