= Nāpili-Honokōwai, Hawaii =

Nāpili-Honokōwai
- Census-designated place
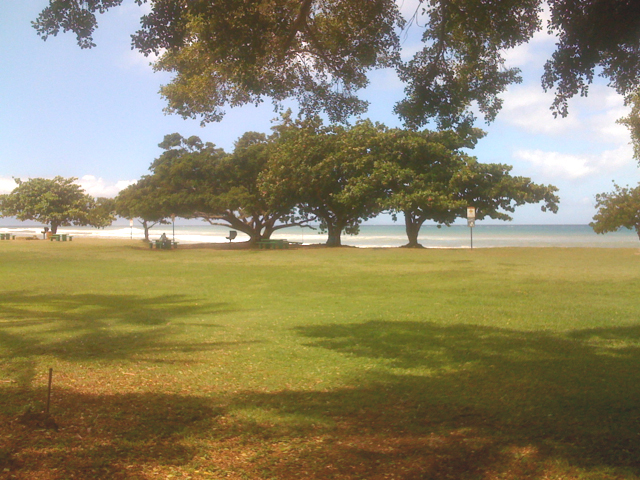
- Honokōwai Beach Park

- Location in Maui County and the state of Hawaii
- Coordinates: 20°58′1″N 156°40′14″W
- Country: United States
- State: Hawaii
- County: Maui

Area
  - Total: 4.24 sq mi (10.98 km^{2})
  - Land: 2.60 sq mi (6.73 km^{2})
  - Water: 1.64 sq mi (4.25 km^{2})

Population (2020)
  - Total: 7,042
  - Density: 2,711.2/sq mi (1,046.79/km^{2})
- Time zone: UTC-10 (Hawaii-Aleutian)
- ZIP code: 96761
- Area code: 808
- FIPS code: 15-54100

Nāpili-Honokōwai is a census-designated place (CDP) in Maui County, Hawaii, United States. The population was 7,042 at the 2020 census.

== Geography ==
Nāpili-Honokōwai is located at 20°58′1″N 156°40′14″W (20.966949, -156.670672), between Kapalua to the north and Kāʻanapali to the south. It consists of three separate neighborhoods: Napili, Kahana, and Honokowai (from north to south).

According to the United States Census Bureau, the CDP has an area of 4.3 square miles (11.1 km^{2}), of which 2.6 square miles (6.8 km^{2}) is land and 1.7 square miles (4.3 km^{2}), or 38.35%, is water.

== Transportation ==
Nāpili-Honokōwai's beaches were formerly serviced by Kaanapali Airport but now use its replacement, Kapalua Airport (also known as the Kapalua-West Maui Airport), both centrally located in the northernmost central territory of the largest Napili-Honokowai land area, known colloquially as Lokuho.

== Demographics ==
Historical population
Census	Pop.	Note	%±
2020	7,042		—
U.S. Decennial Census

As of the census of 2000, there were 6,788 people, 2,629 households, and 1,469 families residing in the CDP. The population density was 1,153.9 inhabitants per square mile (445.5/km^{2}). There were 4,681 housing units at an average density of 795.7 per square mile (307.2/km^{2}). The racial makeup of the CDP was 53.62% White, 0.72% African American, 0.43% Native American, 19.12% Asian, 8.09% Pacific Islander, 4.15% from other races, and 13.86% from two or more races. Hispanic or Latino of any race were 10.72% of the population.

There were 2,629 households, of which 28.3% had children under the age of 18 living with them, 42.4% were married couples living together, 8.8% had a female householder with no husband present, and 44.1% were non-families. 27.7% of all households were made up of individuals, and 3.4% had someone living alone who was 65 years of age or older. The average household size was 2.58 and the average family size was 3.20.

In the CDP the population was spread out, with 22.7% under the age of 18, 7.9% from 18 to 24, 40.6% from 25 to 44, 22.5% from 45 to 64, and 6.2% who were 65 years of age or older. The median age was 35 years. For every 100 females, there were 106.6 males. For every 100 females age 18 and over, there were 107.7 males.

The median household income was $51,030, and the median family income was $56,944. Males had a median income of $32,554 versus $28,979 for females. The per capita income was $24,814. About 5.5% of families and 9.5% of the population were below the poverty line, including 9.0% of those under age 18 and 1.7% of those age 65 or over.

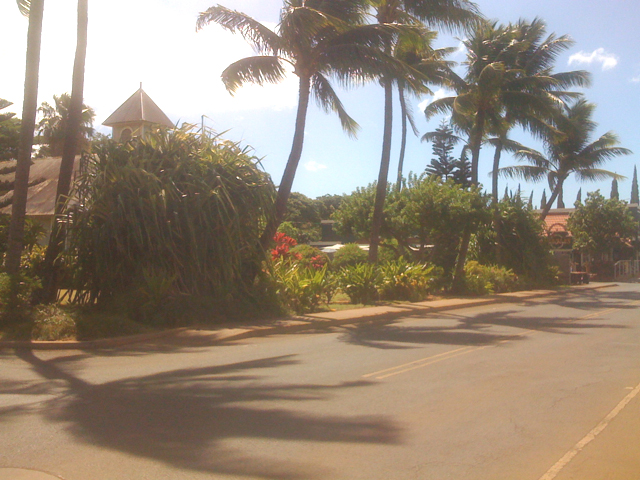
Lower Honoapiʻilani Road

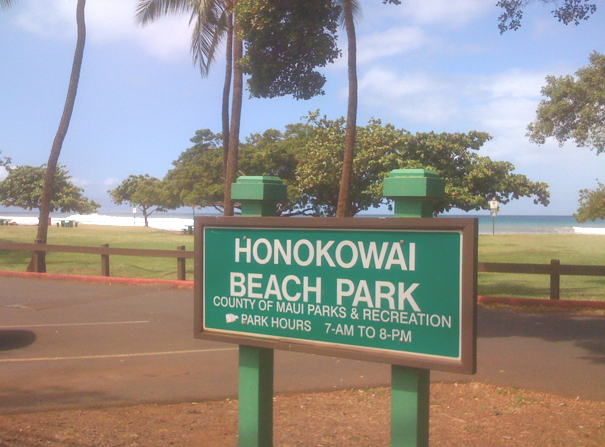
Honokōwai Beach Park
