= Westin Nanea Ocean Villas =

Coordinates: 20.9422°N 156.6905°W

The Westin Nanea Ocean Villas
- Interactive map of the The Westin Nanea Ocean Villas area
- Hotel chain: Westin Hotels & Resorts

General information
- Location: Lahaina, Maui, Hawaii, 45 Kai Malina Parkway, Lahaina, Maui, HI, 96761
- Opening: April 2017
- Owner: Westin Hotels & Resorts

Other information
- Number of rooms: 390

Website
- http://www.westinnanea.com/

The Westin Nanea Ocean Villas is a hotel resort in Kaanapali, Hawaii. It is located on the western side of the island of Maui. Opened in April 2017, the hotel consists eight six-story buildings, with one-, two- and three-bedroom villas. The resort is located adjacent to the Westin Ka'anapali Ocean Resort Villas.
