= Nāpili, Hawaii =

Unincorporated community in Hawaii

Nāpili is a district of Lahaina, Maui on the Hawaiian island of Maui. For United States Census purposes, it is part of the Nāpili-Honokōwai census-designated place, which also includes the neighborhoods of Kahana and Honokōwai.

== Geography ==
Nāpili is located on the west side of the island of Maui. It is considered to be a satellite town of Lāhainā, located approximately 6 miles to the south. The town is among the drier regions on the entire island, owing to its position on the leeward side of the mountains. Unlike some portions of Maui, Nāpili is characterised by rolling hills all the way to the coast. Much of its coastline consists of black volcanic rock, rather than beaches.

== Demographics ==
Nāpili is a relatively working class town, and native Hawaiian language is spoken extensively, though most residents are at least somewhat fluent in English. Many of its residents work in the resort towns of Kāʻanapali and Lāhainā, to the south. Insufficient geographies along the coast have limited desirability for resorts to develop along 'Nāpili's coast.
