= Māhinahina, Hawaii =

Unincorporated community in Hawaii, United States

Māhinahina
- Census-designated place
- Location within Hawaii
- Coordinates: 20°57′14″N 156°39′23″W
- Country: United States
- State: Hawaii
- County: Maui

Area
  - Total: 6.66 sq mi (17.25 km^{2})
  - Land: 6.65 sq mi (17.23 km^{2})
  - Water: 0.0039 sq mi (0.01 km^{2})
- Elevation: 732 ft (223 m)

Population (2020)
  - Total: 910
  - Density: 136.8/sq mi (52.81/km^{2})
- Time zone: UTC-10 (Hawaii-Aleutian)
- ZIP code: 96761
- Area code: 808
- GNIS feature ID: 2583423

Māhinahina is an unincorporated community and census-designated place on the island of Maui in Maui County, Hawaii, United States. Its population was 910 as of the 2020 census. The community is located on the west side of the island.

== Geography ==
Māhinahina is located at 20.9539453°N 156.6564808°W. According to the U.S. Census Bureau, the community has an area of 6.708 square miles (17.37 km^{2}), of which 6.699 square miles (17.35 km^{2}) is land and 0.009 square miles (0.023 km^{2}) is water.

== Demographics ==
Historical population
Census	Pop.	Note	%±
2020	910		—
U.S. Decennial Census

== Transportation ==
Kapalua Airport is in the CDP.

== Education ==
The school district for the entire state is the Hawaii Department of Education, and it covers Māhinahina.

The 2023 Hawaii wildfires destroyed the original King Kamehameha III Elementary School in Lahaina. As of 2024 it has a temporary location in Pulelehua, in the Māhinahina CDP, though it has a Lahiana post office address. The temporary campus is adjacent to Kapalua Airport.
