= Coeur d'Alene Airport =

Coordinates: 47°46′28″N 116°49′10″W

Coeur d'Alene Airport / Pappy Boyington Field
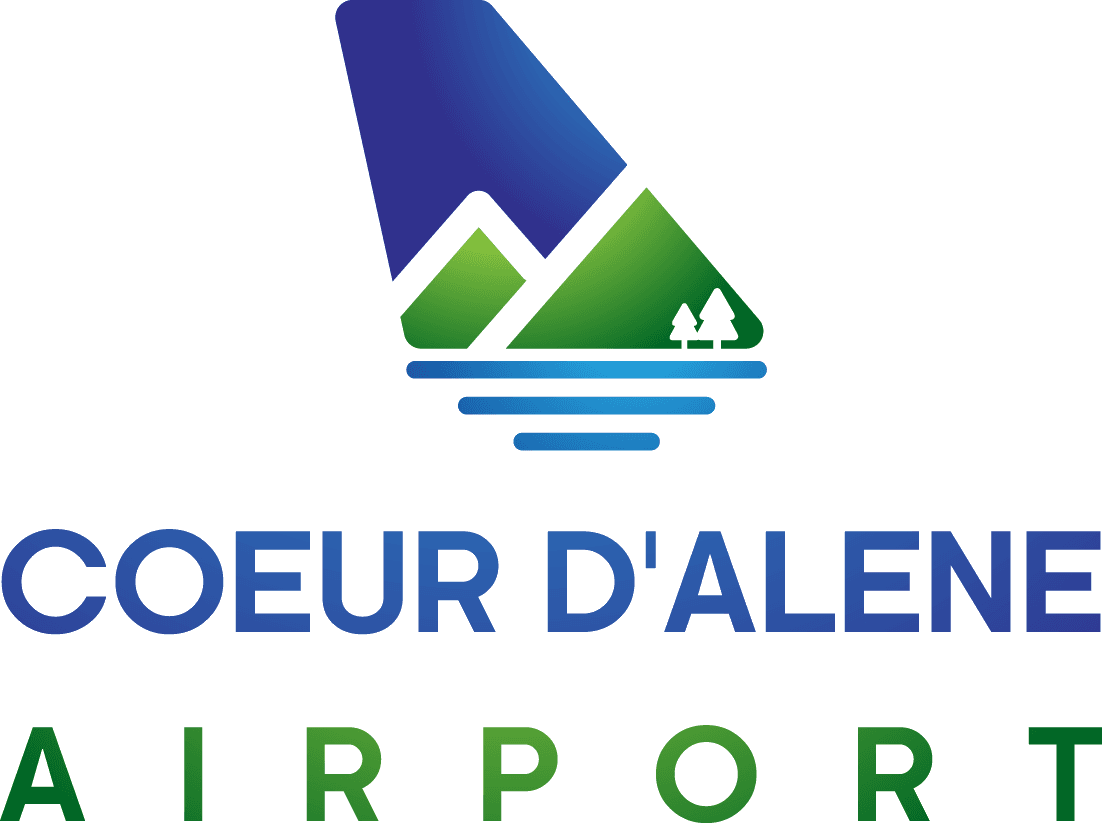
- IATA: COE; ICAO: KCOE; FAA LID: COE

Summary
- Airport type: Public
- Owner: Kootenai County
- Serves: Coeur d'Alene, Idaho
- Location: Kootenai County, Idaho
- Hub for: Empire Airlines
- Elevation AMSL: 2,320 ft (710 m)
- Website: www.kcgov.us/160/Airport

Maps
- FAA airport diagram
- Interactive map of Coeur d'Alene Airport / Pappy Boyington Field

Runways
Direction	Length		Surface
Direction	ft	m	Surface
6/24	7,400	2,256	Asphalt
2/20	5,400	1,646	Asphalt

Statistics (2018)
- Aircraft operations: 123,052
- Based aircraft: 294
- Sources: airport website and FAA

Coeur d'Alene Airport / Pappy Boyington Field (IATA: COE, ICAO: KCOE, FAA LID: COE) is a county-owned public-use airport, located in Kootenai County, Idaho, United States. It is located nine miles (14 km) northwest of the central business district of Coeur d'Alene and is surrounded by the city of Hayden on three sides.

The airport was known as Coeur d'Alene Air Terminal until September 2007, when it was renamed Coeur d'Alene Airport / Pappy Boyington Field to honor World War II multiple ace Col. Gregory "Pappy" Boyington (1912–1988), a Medal of Honor recipient born in Coeur d'Alene.

== History ==
Built as Coeur d'Alene Municipal Airport in 1942 by the Corps of Engineers, it was equipped with two 5,400-foot (1,650 m) runways, the asphalt paving of which began in July 1942 at a width of 150 feet (46 m). A taxiway was also constructed, 5,400 ft × 150 ft (1,646 m × 46 m), paved to a width of fifty feet (15 m). The $357,729 paving contract was let to Roy S. Bair, of Spokane, Washington. A contract for electrical lighting for the field went to H. C. Moss of Wenatchee in the amount of $15,198.

== Facilities and aircraft ==
Coeur d'Alene Airport covers an area of 1,140 acres (4.6 km^{2}) which contains two asphalt paved runways: 6/24 measuring 7,400 ft × 100 ft (2,256 m × 30 m) and 2/20 measuring 5,400 ft × 75 ft (1,646 m × 23 m)

For the 12-month period ending December 31, 2018, the airport had 123,052 aircraft operations, an average of 337 per day: 77% general aviation, 22% air taxi, 1% military, and <1% airline. There were 294 aircraft based at this airport: 253 single-engine, 18 multi-engine, 12 jet, 5 helicopter, 4 ultralight and 2 glider.

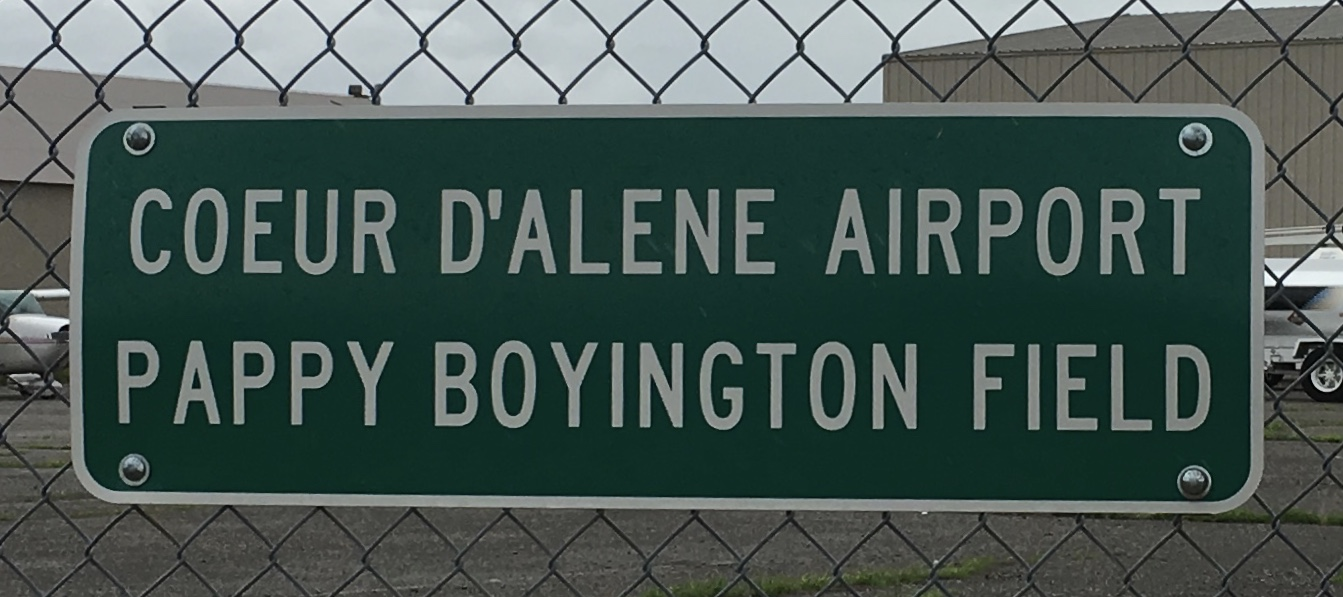
Sign on the perimeter fence of the Coeur D'Alene (Idaho) Airport

== News and Updates ==
As of 2025, a proposed viewing center will be placed on the northeast side of KCOE with public parking along the north fence line from Ramsey Road.

== See also ==
- List of airports in Idaho
