= Hayden, Idaho =

Hayden
- City
- Location of Hayden in Kootenai County, Idaho
- Coordinates: 47°45′26″N 116°48′15″W
- Country: United States
- State: Idaho
- County: Kootenai
- Incorporated: June 27, 1955

Area
  - Total: 10.43 sq mi (27.02 km^{2})
  - Land: 10.42 sq mi (26.98 km^{2})
  - Water: 0.015 sq mi (0.04 km^{2})
- Elevation: 2,300 ft (700 m)

Population (2020)
  - Total: 15,570
  - Estimate (2022): 16,531
  - Density: 1,570/sq mi (606.2/km^{2})
- Time zone: UTC–8 (Pacific (PST))
  - Summer (DST): UTC–7 (PDT)
- ZIP Code: 83835
- Area codes: 208 and 986
- FIPS code: 16-36370
- GNIS feature ID: 2410721
- Website: www.haydenid.gov

Hayden is a city in Kootenai County, Idaho, United States. Located in the northern portion of the state, it is a suburb of nearby Coeur d'Alene and its population was 15,570 at the 2020 census.

== History ==
The origins of the city of Hayden has its roots in the history of Hayden Lake. The Coeur D’Alene tribe territory centered around Hayden Lake and nearby Lake Coeur d'Alene, gathering plants, including abundant huckleberries, fish and wildlife found there. The first white man to visit what is now Hayden Lake was Father DeSmet while serving as a missionary to the Coeur d’Alene Indians. While visiting, he named it Lake DeNuf and recorded several stories told by the local tribe about the lake and the surrounding area.

In the 1870s, the Lake Hayden area began attracting white settlers due to the surrounding fertile soils and rich timber resources. Legend has it that three settlers, Mat Heyden (a soldier from Fort Sherman), John Hager and John Hickey played a game of Seven-Up poker to decide who would name the lake. Mat Heyden won and eventually the spelling became standardized to Hayden. Heyden planted the first orchard in the area and established his farm on the western shore of Lake Hayden.

Development centered on this side of the lake, with its close proximity to Coeur d’Alene. At the turn of the century at least three sawmills were located on the lake. One of the mills became part of the Atlas Tie Company, supplying railroad ties across Idaho. During the early 20th century, steamboats plied the waters of Lake Hayden, serving the mills and communities around the lake.

Part of John Hickey's land claim along Hayden Lake became Avondale Cottage, a resort built in 1903. In 1906, investors expanded and reinvented the property into Bozanta Tavern. The Swiss Chalet-inspired hotel was designed by Spokane architect KK Cutter and the grounds were designed by John Charles Olmsted, one of the Olmsted Brothers who designed New York's Central Park. The popularity of the resort was encouraged when the Spokane and Inland Empire Railroad extended a trolley line that connected the area with Coeur d’Alene. This also made the resort easily accessible to the booming Washington city of Spokane and it attracted thousands of visitors to the area. The resort became so well known that both Presidents Theodore Roosevelt and William Howard Taft visited Bozanta. In 1910, F. Lewis Clark, a Spokane millionaire, built on the shores of Lake Hayden what was at the time considered to be the largest and most expensive house in Idaho.

Around the turn of the century, a schoolhouse began to be constructed on the shores of Lake Hayden, but was moved before its completion to make way for the Bozanta Tavern. The school building was moved closer to Government Way and finished there. In 1936 an Art Deco-inspired building was built and it still stands there today.

James Monaghan established the first general store near Lake Hayden, located approximately a half mile east of Government Way along Honeysuckle Avenue. A post office was also established there for a couple of years before relocating, along with the store, closer to Bozanta Tavern. This area, which had a stop on the electric trolley line, was developed by the Granite Investment Company, of which James Mongahan was president. Development around Monaghan and the surrounding countryside was encouraged by irrigation installed by the Malloy Brothers who established the Interstate Irrigation company. They bought up thousands of acres in the area and installed irrigation pipes from Hayden Lake.

As the logging and mining industry grew, and encouraged by irrigation from Hayden Lake, farms and businesses developed around on the west end of the lake to serve the workers. In 1906, DC Corbin took advantage of the high tariff on sugar, bought land north of the Hayden area and hired Japanese workers to farm sugar beets. Many white settlers moved into the area to prove up homesteads under the Homestead Act and the Timber and Stone Act, and worked in the logging and resort industries to help make ends meet. The area also saw poultry and dairy farms established, and by the 1920s, cherry and apple orchards were prolific. The first fruit packing plant in the area was established in 1914 and the Seiter Cannery in Post Falls was located nearby. After cold winters in the 1930s ruined many of the trees, many orchards were not replanted.

Government Way, the main road connecting the area with Coeur d’Alene, bypassed the shores of Lake Hayden by a mile and a half. With the advent of the automobile, the center of the town shifted from the lake and railroad and reoriented towards Government Way. A collection of businesses slowly developed at the intersection of Honeysuckle Avenue which connected the lake community with Government Way. By the 1950s, Government Way was designated as Highway 95 and the community of businesses servicing travelers and locals was called Hayden Village. Meanwhile, the community located on the shores of Lake Hayden became Hayden Lake. In 1972, Highway 95 was moved slightly west to reduce traffic on the main road through Hayden.

The population numbered 718 people in 1950. In 1955, the owners of Sargent's Restaurant in Hayden Village wanted to procure a liquor license. They were stalled by Idaho's alcohol laws. Hayden Village next sought to be annexed into Hayden Lake. When that failed, the “movers and shakers” of the area had a meeting and decided the area should incorporate. The Village of Hayden was incorporated in 1955 with a total of 440 acres with a population of around 700 people. Sargent's Restaurant was able to move forward in procuring its first liquor license and the City of Hayden in Kootenai County was established.

== Geography ==
According to the United States Census Bureau, the city has a total area of 9.61 square miles (24.89 km^{2}), of which 9.60 square miles (24.86 km^{2}) is land and 0.01 square miles (0.03 km^{2}) is water. It lies at the southwestern end of Hayden Lake, and the elevation of the city is 2,287 feet (697 m) above sea level.

=== Transportation ===
Hayden is located on U.S. Route 95 at the junction of Route 41. It is also four miles (6 km) north of Interstate 90 and Coeur d'Alene. The Coeur d'Alene Airport is northwest of Hayden.

== Demographics ==
Historical population
| Census | Pop. | Note | %± |
|---|---|---|---|
| 1960 | 901 | | — |
| 1970 | 1,285 | | 42.6% |
| 1980 | 2,586 | | 101.2% |
| 1990 | 3,744 | | 44.8% |
| 2000 | 9,159 | | 144.6% |
| 2010 | 13,294 | | 45.1% |
| 2020 | 15,570 | | 17.1% |
| 2022 (est.) | 16,531 | | 6.2% |
U.S. Decennial Census; 2020 Census

=== 2020 census ===
As of the 2020 census, Hayden had a population of 15,570. The median age was 43.2 years. 22.6% of residents were under the age of 18 and 23.6% of residents were 65 years of age or older. For every 100 females there were 95.0 males, and for every 100 females age 18 and over there were 91.6 males age 18 and over.

99.8% of residents lived in urban areas, while 0.2% lived in rural areas.

There were 6,131 households in Hayden, of which 29.8% had children under the age of 18 living in them. Of all households, 56.6% were married-couple households, 14.0% were households with a male householder and no spouse or partner present, and 23.3% were households with a female householder and no spouse or partner present. About 23.6% of all households were made up of individuals and 13.4% had someone living alone who was 65 years of age or older.

There were 6,380 housing units, of which 3.9% were vacant. The homeowner vacancy rate was 0.7% and the rental vacancy rate was 5.4%.

Racial composition as of the 2020 census
| Race | Number | Percent |
|---|---|---|
| White | 13,900 | 89.3% |
| Black or African American | 40 | 0.3% |
| American Indian and Alaska Native | 123 | 0.8% |
| Asian | 145 | 0.9% |
| Native Hawaiian and Other Pacific Islander | 16 | 0.1% |
| Some other race | 218 | 1.4% |
| Two or more races | 1,128 | 7.2% |
| Hispanic or Latino (of any race) | 806 | 5.2% |

=== 2010 census ===
As of the census of 2010, there were 13,294 people, 5,212 households, and 3,645 families living in the city. The population density was 1,384.8 inhabitants per square mile (534.7/km^{2}). There were 5,563 housing units at an average density of 579.5 per square mile (223.7/km^{2}). The racial makeup of the city was 95.1% White, 0.2% African American, 0.9% Native American, 0.9% Asian, 0.1% Pacific Islander, 0.7% from other races, and 2.1% from two or more races. Hispanic or Latino of any race were 4.2%.

Of the 5,212 households 33.6% had children under the age of 18 living with them, 55.6% were married couples living together, 9.5% had a female householder with no husband present, 4.8% had a male householder with no wife present, and 30.1% were non-families. 24.9% of households were one person and 12.8% were one person aged 65 or older. The average household size was 2.54 and the average family size was 3.01.

The median age was 39.4 years. 25.6% of residents were under the age of 18; 7.1% were between the ages of 18 and 24; 25% were from 25 to 44; 25.1% were from 45 to 64; and 17.2% were 65 or older. The gender makeup of the city was 48.3% male and 51.7% female.

=== 2000 census ===
As of the census of 2000, there were 9,159 people, 3,501 households, and 2,562 families living in the city. The population density was 1,167.5 inhabitants per square mile (450.8/km^{2}). There were 3,714 housing units at an average density of 473.4 per square mile (182.8/km^{2}). The racial makeup of the city was 96.09% White, 0.19% African American, 0.76% Native American, 0.55% Asian, 0.08% Pacific Islander, 0.94% from other races, and 1.40% from two or more races. Hispanic or Latino of any race were 2.43%.

Of the 3,501 households 36.9% had children under the age of 18 living with them, 60.3% were married couples living together, 9.1% had a female householder with no husband present, and 26.8% were non-families. 21.6% of households were one person and 9.5% were one person aged 65 or older. The average household size was 2.60 and the average family size was 3.04.

The age distribution was 27.6% under the age of 18, 7.4% from 18 to 24, 30.3% from 25 to 44, 21.2% from 45 to 64, and 13.5% 65 or older. The median age was 35 years. For every 100 females, there were 94.9 males. For every 100 females age 18 and over, there were 91.9 males.

The median household income was $37,097 and the median family income was $40,875. Males had a median income of $35,339 versus $21,388 for females. The per capita income for the city was $16,387. About 5.8% of families and 9.2% of the population were below the poverty line, including 13.5% of those under age 18 and 4.5% of those age 65 or over.

== Economy ==
Empire Airlines has its headquarters in Hayden. Rollercoaster designer Rocky Mountain Construction is also headquartered in Hayden.

== Notable people ==
- Richard Butler (white supremacist)
- Patty Duke, actress (lived in Hayden)
- Matthew Inman, webcomic creator
- Don Larsen, MLB pitcher
- Doug Okuniewicz, member of the Idaho House of Representatives
- Trevor Prangley, professional MMA fighter
