= Kapalua, Hawaii =

- Census-designated place
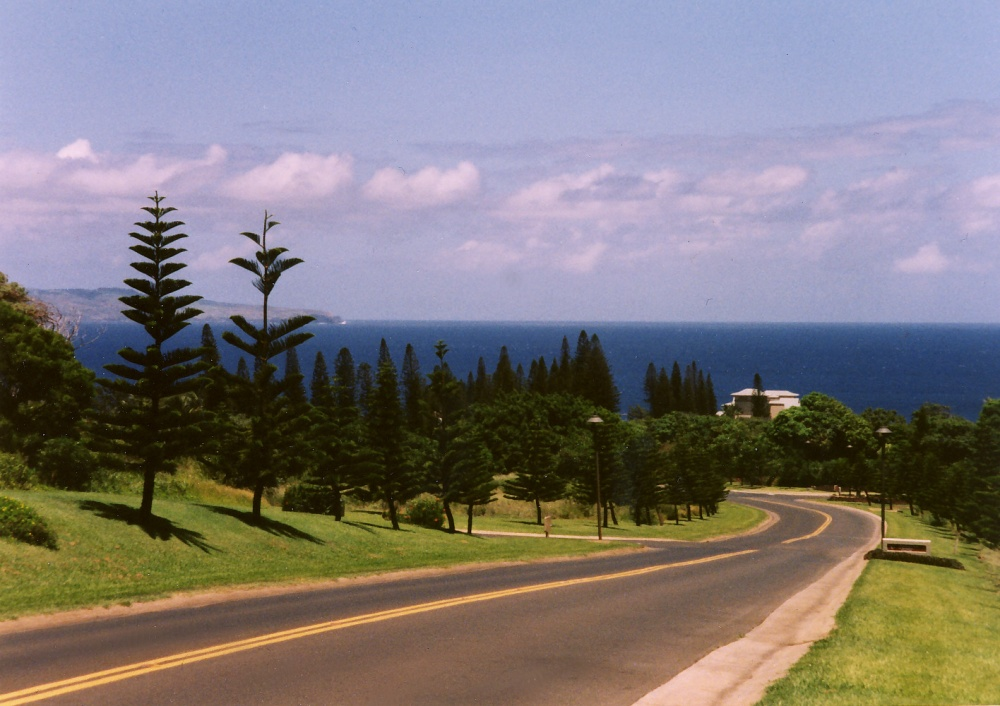
- Kapalua from Route 30

- Location in Maui County and the state of Hawaii
- Coordinates: 20°59′48″N 156°39′11″W
- Country: United States
- State: Hawaii
- County: Maui

Area
  - Total: 5.86 sq mi (15.17 km^{2})
  - Land: 4.85 sq mi (12.55 km^{2})
  - Water: 1.01 sq mi (2.62 km^{2})
- Elevation: 207 ft (63 m)

Population (2020)
  - Total: 495
  - Density: 102.2/sq mi (39.45/km^{2})
- Time zone: UTC-10 (Hawaii-Aleutian)
- ZIP code: 96761
- Area code: 808
- FIPS code: 15-29725
- GNIS feature ID: 1867255

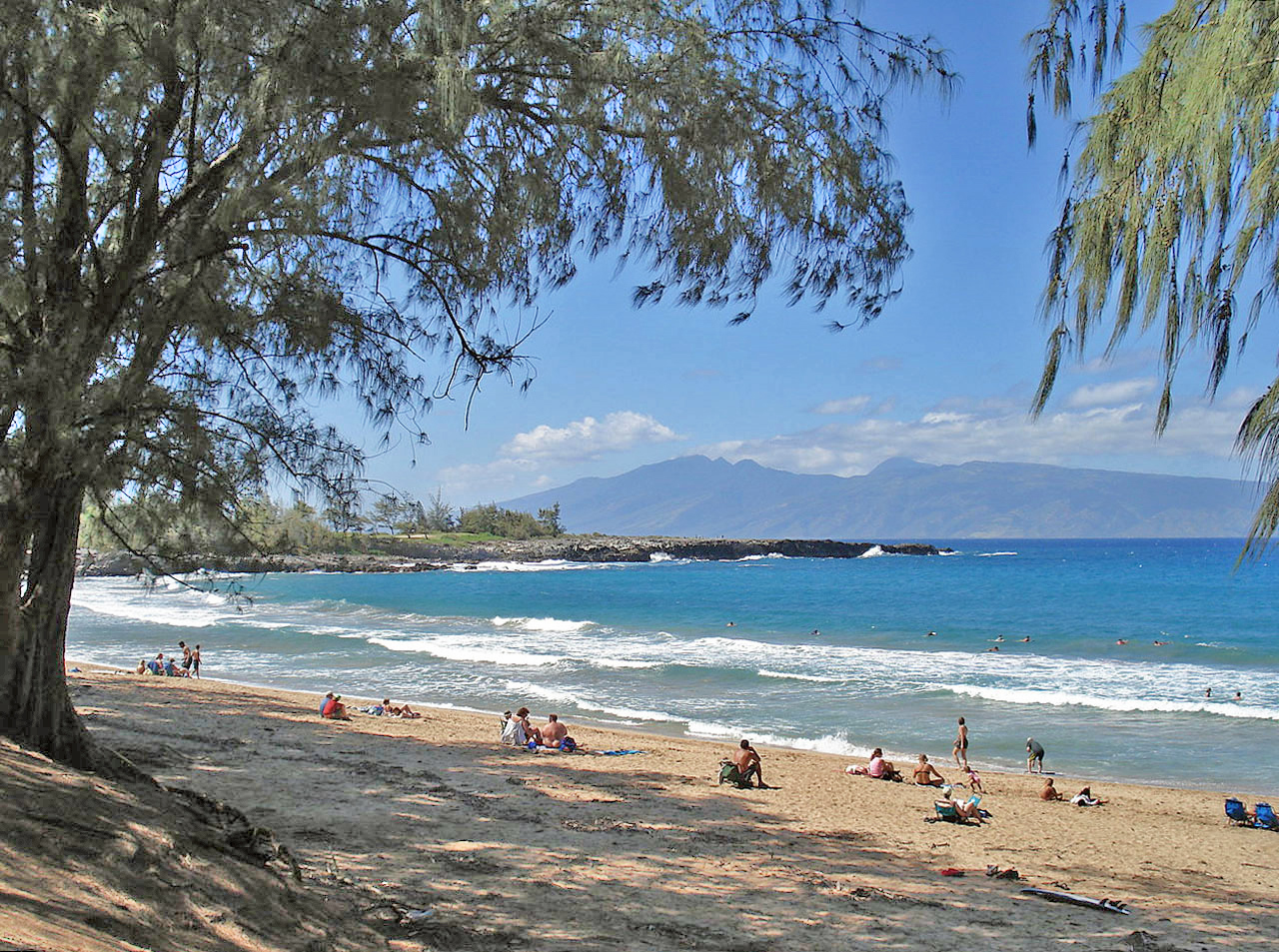
D. T. Fleming Park at Honokahua Bay

Kapalua (Hawaiian for 'two borders') is a census-designated place (CDP) in Maui County, Hawaiʻi, United States. A resort development by the Maui Land & Pineapple Company extends inland from Kapalua Bay and Honolua Bay. The population was 495 at the 2020 census.

== Geography ==
Kapalua is located along the northwest coast of Maui at 20°59′48″N 156°39′11″W along Route 30, known as the Honoapiʻilani Highway. The Hawaiian name for this area was Honokahua.

According to the United States Census Bureau, the CDP has a total area of 5.8 square miles (15.1 km^{2}), of which 4.8 square miles (12.4 km^{2}) is land and 1.0 square mile (2.6 km^{2}), or 17.41%, is water.

Kapalua has a view of the islands of Molokaʻi and Lānaʻi.

=== Climate ===
Kapalua has a tropical savanna climate, the rare dry-summer variant (Köppen: As; Trewartha: Asaa).

Climate data for Kapalua, Hawaii (Kapalua Airport) 1991–2020 normals, extremes 1987–present
Month	Jan	Feb	Mar	Apr	May	Jun	Jul	Aug	Sep	Oct	Nov	Dec	Year
Record high °F (°C)	89 (32)	92 (33)	89 (32)	98 (37)	92 (33)	93 (34)	94 (34)	94 (34)	94 (34)	92 (33)	90 (32)	89 (32)	98 (37)
Mean daily maximum °F (°C)	79.0 (26.1)	79.0 (26.1)	79.4 (26.3)	81.0 (27.2)	83.0 (28.3)	85.0 (29.4)	85.8 (29.9)	86.2 (30.1)	86.6 (30.3)	85.1 (29.5)	82.0 (27.8)	79.8 (26.6)	82.7 (28.2)
Daily mean °F (°C)	72.3 (22.4)	72.4 (22.4)	72.7 (22.6)	74.3 (23.5)	75.9 (24.4)	77.7 (25.4)	78.7 (25.9)	79.2 (26.2)	79.3 (26.3)	78.2 (25.7)	75.8 (24.3)	73.7 (23.2)	75.9 (24.4)
Mean daily minimum °F (°C)	65.7 (18.7)	65.8 (18.8)	66.1 (18.9)	67.5 (19.7)	68.8 (20.4)	70.4 (21.3)	71.5 (21.9)	72.1 (22.3)	72.0 (22.2)	71.4 (21.9)	69.7 (20.9)	67.6 (19.8)	69.1 (20.6)
Record low °F (°C)	59 (15)	57 (14)	58 (14)	61 (16)	61 (16)	64 (18)	62 (17)	65 (18)	60 (16)	65 (18)	63 (17)	58 (14)	57 (14)
Average rainfall inches (mm)	3.51 (89)	2.43 (62)	3.92 (100)	2.22 (56)	1.49 (38)	1.07 (27)	1.58 (40)	1.37 (35)	1.22 (31)	2.23 (57)	2.88 (73)	3.85 (98)	27.77 (705)
Average rainy days (≥ 0.01 in)	11.4	11.5	15.1	14.4	11.8	13.5	15.5	13.3	11.7	12.8	14.0	15.2	160.2
Source: NOAA

== Recreation and leisure ==
Kapalua Resort offers accommodations, a variety of restaurants, a shop, and several golf courses.

The area has several beaches. Kapalua Bay is the resort namesake at 20°59′58″N 156°40′0″W. The name kapa lua means "two borders" in the Hawaiian language. Oneloa Bay at 21°0′17″N 156°39′31″W and Honokahua Bay are also backed by the resort. Mokuleʻia Bay and Honolua Bay are to the north in Honolua and Nāpili is to the south. Kapalua Bay was named "Best Beach in the World" by the readers of Condé Nast Traveler magazine, "America's Best Beach" on the first annual list of Stephen Leatherman's Top 10 Beaches in America, and the "Best Beach in America" by the Travel Channel, among other honors.

During the plantation era, the Kapalua beach was known as Fleming Beach but was renamed after the resort. A public access site on Honokahua Bay about half a mile to the north was named D.T. Fleming Park in 1975 to keep the tribute to David Thomas Fleming (1881–1955), Honolua Plantation manager of the area before the resort was built.

== Transportation ==
The small Kapalua Airport was built to the south in Honokōwai in 1987, replacing the even smaller Kaanapali Airport.

== Demographics ==
Historical population
Census	Pop.	Note	%±
2020	495		—
U.S. Decennial Census

As of the census of 2000, there were 467 people, 186 households, and 132 families residing in the CDP. The population density was 272.9 inhabitants per square mile (105.4/km^{2}). There were 831 housing units at an average density of 485.6 per square mile (187.5/km^{2}). The racial makeup of the CDP was 59.31% White, 0.43% African American, 11.35% Asian, 13.28% Pacific Islander, 0.21% from other races, and 15.42% from two or more races. Hispanic or Latino of any race were 3.43% of the population.

There were 186 households, out of which 25.3% had children under the age of 18 living with them, 62.9% were married couples living together, 4.3% had a female householder with no husband present, and 28.5% were non-families. 12.9% of all households were made up of individuals, and 4.3% had someone living alone who was 65 years of age or older. The average household size was 2.51 and the average family size was 2.74.

In the CDP the population was spread out, with 17.6% under the age of 18, 6.4% from 18 to 24, 32.1% from 25 to 44, 27.2% from 45 to 64, and 16.7% who were 65 years of age or older. The median age was 42 years. For every 100 females, there were 92.2 males. For every 100 females age 18 and over, there were 108.1 males.

The median income for a household in the CDP was $57,292, and the median income for a family was $61,875. Males had a median income of $35,417 versus $32,321 for females. The per capita income for the CDP was $75,992. About 5.1% of families and 7.2% of the population were below the poverty line, including 5.6% of those under age 18 and none of those age 65 or over.
