= Empire Airlines Flight 8284 =

2009 aviation accident

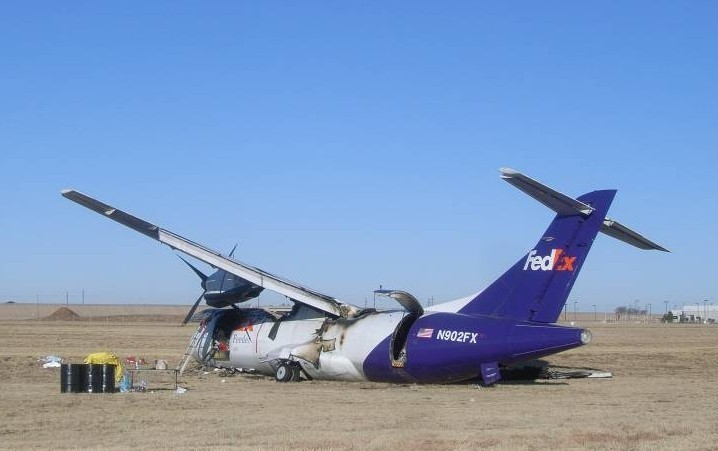
- Wreckage of N902FX

Accident
- Date: January 27, 2009
- Summary: Unstabilized approach, pilot error
- Site: Near Lubbock Preston Smith International Airport

Aircraft
- N902FX, the aircraft involved in the accident, seen in 2007
- Aircraft type: ATR 42–320
- Operator: Empire Airlines for FedEx Feeder
- IATA flight No.: EM8284
- ICAO flight No.: CFS8284
- Call sign: EMPIRE 8284
- Registration: N902FX
- Flight origin: Fort Worth Alliance Airport, Tarrant County, Texas
- Destination: Lubbock Preston Smith International Airport, Lubbock County, Texas
- Occupants: 2
- Passengers: 0
- Crew: 2
- Fatalities: 0
- Injuries: 2
- Survivors: 2

Empire Airlines Flight 8284 was a cargo flight operated by Empire Airlines for FedEx Feeder from Fort Worth Alliance Airport to Lubbock Preston Smith International Airport, Texas. On January 27, 2009, it crashed on final approach to its destination. Both crew members survived with minor injuries but the aircraft was written off.

== Background ==
=== Aircraft ===
The aircraft involved was an ATR 42-320 registered as N902FX, with serial number 175. It was manufactured by ATR in 1990. In its 19 years of service, it had logged 28,768 airframe hours in 32,379 takeoff and landing cycles. It was also equipped with two Pratt & Whitney Canada PW121 engines. In 2005, the aircraft was converted from a passenger to a freighter aircraft.

=== Crew ===
In command was 52-year-old Captain Rodney Holberton with a total of 13,935 flight hours, with 12,742 hours as pilot-in-command (PIC). He had logged 2,052 hours on the ATR 42, 1,896 as PIC. The first officer was 26-year-old Heather Cornell with 2,109 hours, according to the records of Empire Airlines. She had logged 130 hours operating the ATR 42 as second-in-command.

== Accident ==
Flight reconstruction simulated by NTSB

The aircraft approached Lubbock International Airport at around 4:30 am Central Standard Time in freezing mist.

During the approach, a flight control problem prevented deployment of the flaps. The first officer continued the approach while the captain attempted to fix the flaps issue. Neither crew member monitored the airspeed, and the aircraft began descending at over 2,000 feet (610 m) per minute, leading to a "Pull Up" warning. The crew pulled up 17 seconds after the initial alarm. The aircraft then entered an aerodynamic stall and crashed. The aircraft landed short of the runway threshold, and skidded 3,300 feet (1,000 m) down and off runway 17R. A small fire began shortly after.

Airport officials said that weather conditions did not contribute to the accident.

== Investigation ==
The National Transportation Safety Board (NTSB) investigated the cause of the accident. The flight data recorder and cockpit voice recorder showed that the crew continued the landing after the flaps failed to deploy rather than conducting a go-around. The crew also failed to apply maximum engine thrust immediately after the stall, waiting 17 seconds after a TAWS warning had sounded before applying thrust. In postaccident interviews, the captain said that he had sleep fatigue before the flight due to "high-workload situations" which affected his performance. After the investigation was completed the NTSB released their final report in 2011.

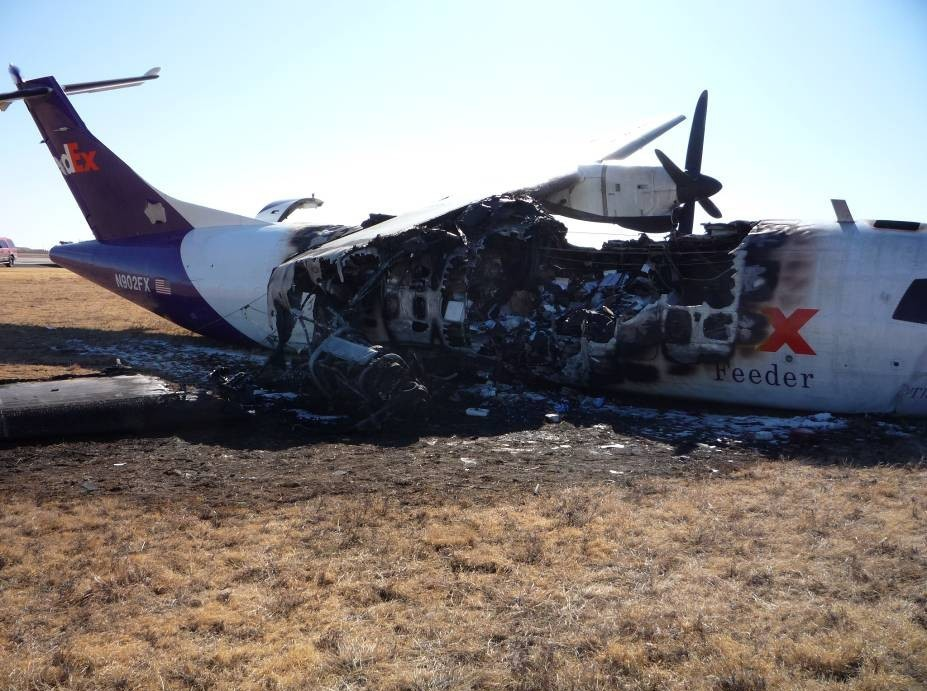
The other side of the wreckage

It concluded with investigators stating that "The National Transportation Safety Board determines that the probable cause of this accident was the flight crew's failure to monitor and maintain a minimum safe airspeed while executing an instrument approach in icing conditions, which resulted in an aerodynamic stall at low altitude. Contributing to the accident were 1) the flight crew's failure to follow published standard operating procedures in response to a flap anomaly, 2) the captain's decision to continue with the unstabilized approach, 3) the flight crew's poor crew resource management, and 4) fatigue due to the time of day in which the accident occurred and a cumulative sleep debt, which likely impaired the captain's performance."

== Aftermath ==
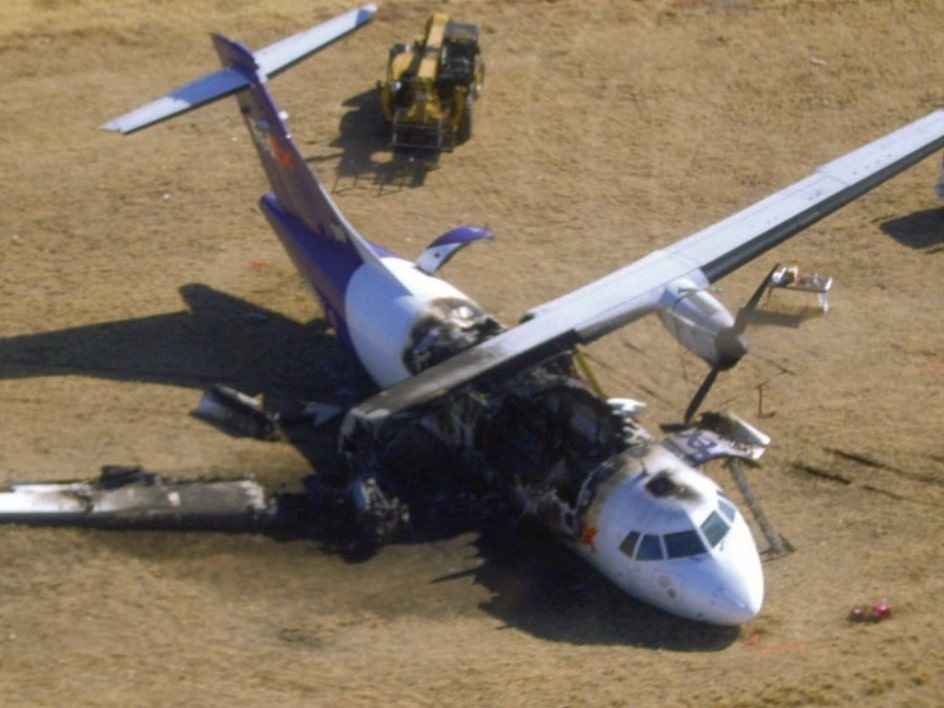
N902FX at the accident site

N902FX was so badly damaged in the accident it was written off. The crew members were sent to hospital for minor injuries, and were later released. Both returned to flying with FedEx Express a month later.

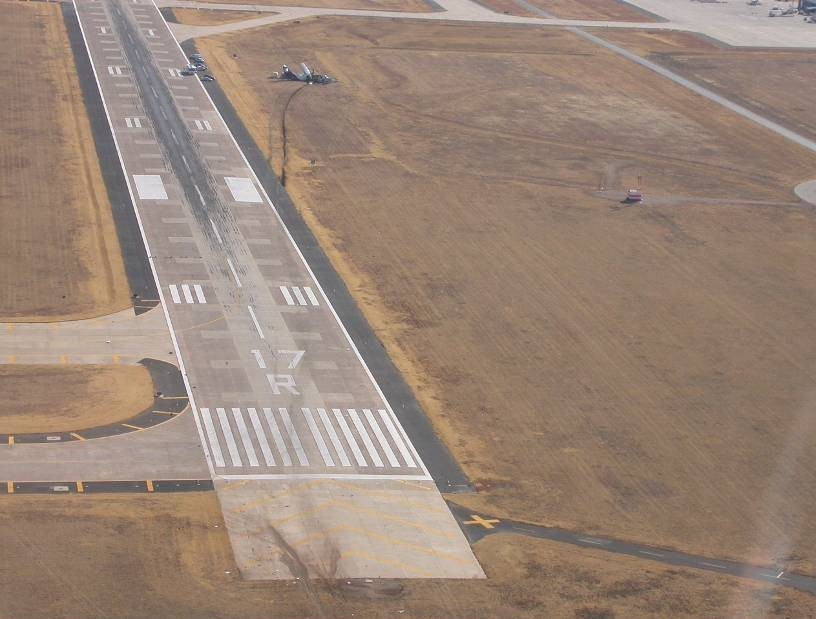
Overview of the accident site

The NTSB issued nine safety recommendations as a result of the crash, including recommendations to prevent in-flight icing. The crash led to the EASA reviewing airplane stick shakers to protect from stalls and adopting a rule regarding the simulation of icing conditions in flight simulators.
