= Lubbock Preston Smith International Airport =

Airport in Lubbock County, Texas

Lubbock Preston Smith International Airport (former South Plains Army Airfield)
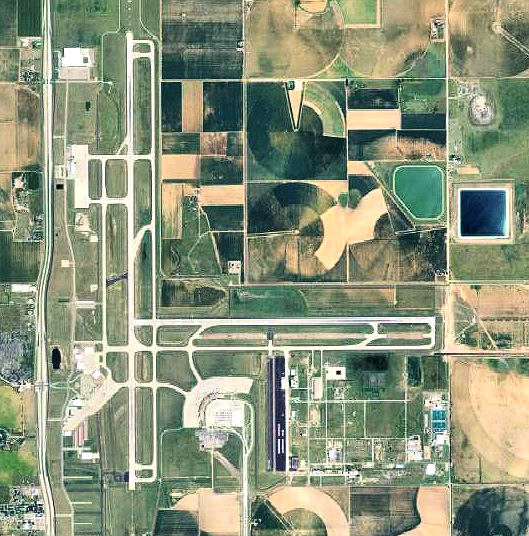
- 2006 orthophoto
- IATA: LBB; ICAO: KLBB; FAA LID: LBB

Summary
- Airport type: Public
- Owner: City of Lubbock
- Serves: Lubbock, Texas
- Location: 5401 N. Martin Luther King Blvd., Lubbock, TX 79403
- Elevation AMSL: 3,282 ft (1,000 m)
- Coordinates: 33°39′49″N 101°49′14″W
- Website: http://www.flylbb.com

Map
- Interactive map of Lubbock Preston Smith International Airport

Runways
Direction	Length		Surface
Direction	ft	m	Surface
17R/35L	11,500	3,505	Concrete
8/26	8,003	2,439	Concrete
17L/35R	2,891	881	Asphalt

Statistics (2022)
- Aircraft operations (year ending 5/31/2022): 92,881
- Based aircraft: 156
- Source: Federal Aviation Administration

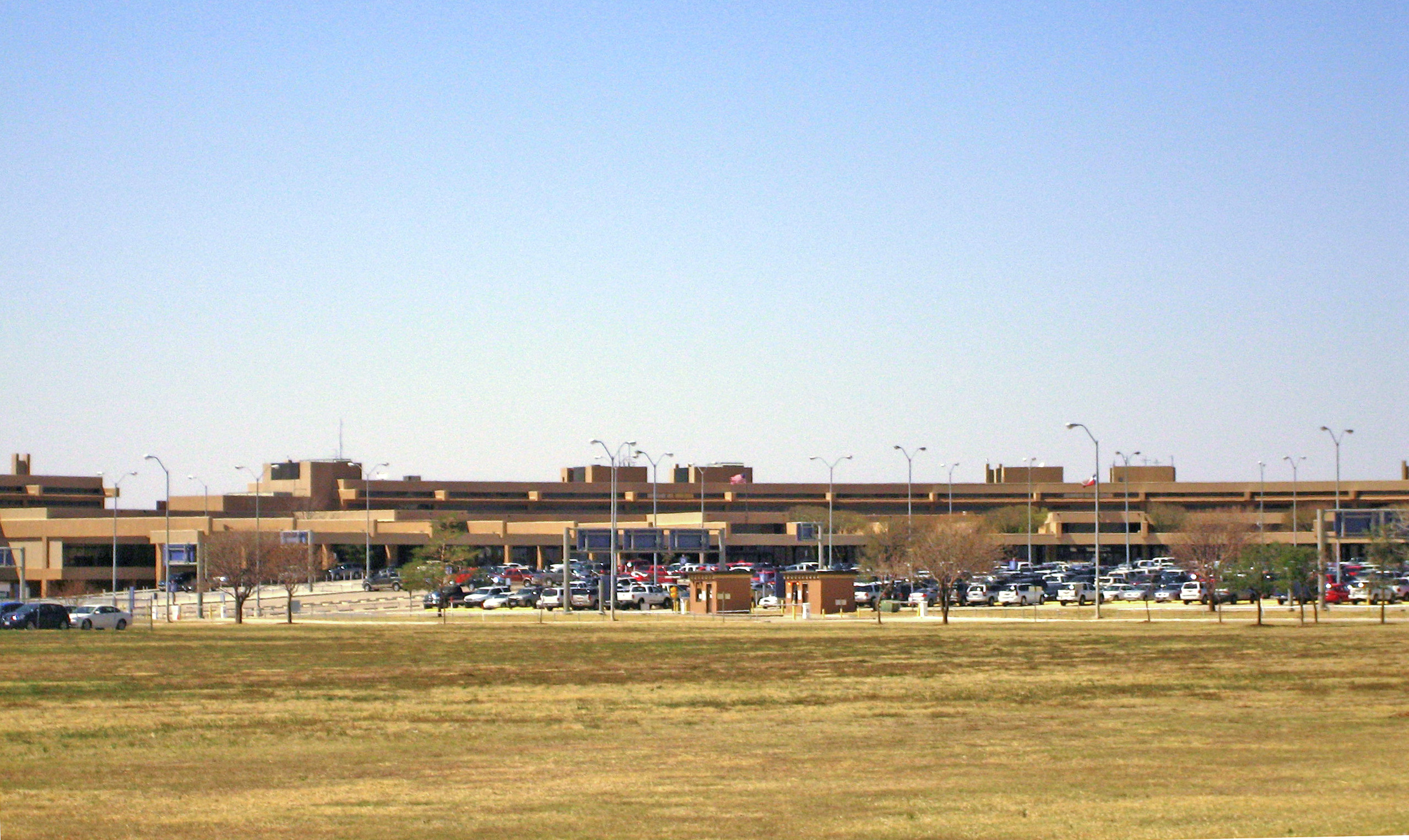
Lubbock Preston Smith International Airport

Lubbock Preston Smith International Airport (IATA: LBB, ICAO: KLBB, FAA LID: LBB) is five miles north of Lubbock, in Lubbock County, Texas, United States. Originally Lubbock International Airport, it was renamed in 2004 for former Texas governor Preston E. Smith, an alumnus of Texas Tech University.

The National Plan of Integrated Airport Systems for 2011–2015 classifies it as a primary commercial service airport. Federal Aviation Administration records say the airport had 520,181 passenger boardings (enplanements) in calendar year 2019, and 487,000 in 2018.

The airport is the eighth-busiest airport in Texas. Lubbock International is first among the smaller Texas cities (behind both Dallas airports, both Houston airports, San Antonio, Austin, and El Paso). Lubbock Preston Smith International Airport is a hub for FedEx and UPS feeder planes to cities around the South Plains.

== History ==
The airport opened in November 1937 as South Plains Airport. In 1942 the United States Army Air Forces indicated a need for the airport as a training airfield. After its requisition by the Air Force, it was assigned to the World War II Army Air Forces Flying Training Command, Gulf Coast Training Center (later Central Flying Training Command). The airport was renamed South Plains Army Airfield and a rapid period of construction was begun to convert the civil airport into a military training airfield.

Construction involved runways and airplane hangars, with three concrete runways, several taxiways and a large apron and a control tower. Several large hangars were also built. Buildings were utilitarian and quickly assembled. Most base buildings, not meant for long-term use, were of temporary or semi-permanent materials. Some hangars had steel frames and the occasional brick or tile brick building could be seen, but most support buildings had concrete foundations and frame construction clad in little more than plywood and tarpaper.

The base was activated on September 11, 1942, as the South Plains Flying School. The mission was ground and flying training of glider pilots. Glider training was performed by the 848th School Squadron (Special), with overall training being under the 64th Two-Engine Flying Training Group of the 80th Flying Training Wing. Aircraft assigned were Douglas C-47 Skytrains and Waco CG-4A gliders. The CG-4A was the USAAF's primary glider, consisting of little more than a wooden and fabric shell, equipped with radio, wheels, and brakes. Glider pilots trained at South Plains flew these craft in combat during the Normandy Invasion, Operation Market-Garden, and also Operation Varsity, the airborne invasion of Germany.

By late 1944 Flying Training Command ended all glider instruction, and control of South Plains AAF was transferred to the Air Service Command at Tinker Field, Oklahoma. Under Air Service Command, South Plains became a maintenance and supply depot for excess aircraft that could not be accommodated at Tinker. After the war ended, in 1946 and 1947, South Plains was used as a storage facility for excess aircraft prior to their reclamation.

Military use of South Plains ended on December 1, 1947, and it was returned to the local government for civil use. A civilian terminal was constructed on the southwest corner of the airfield for commercial airline activity and used through the 1950s and 1960s. The current airline terminal was opened about 1976. The original terminal now houses the Silent Wings Museum dedicated to World War II glider pilots.

Major renovations to the terminal building began in 2019, featuring an expanded TSA screening area, refreshed check-in counters, gates, waiting areas, restrooms, concessions, rental-car desks and more. Many of these improvements began to open to the public in late 2021.

=== Historical airline service ===
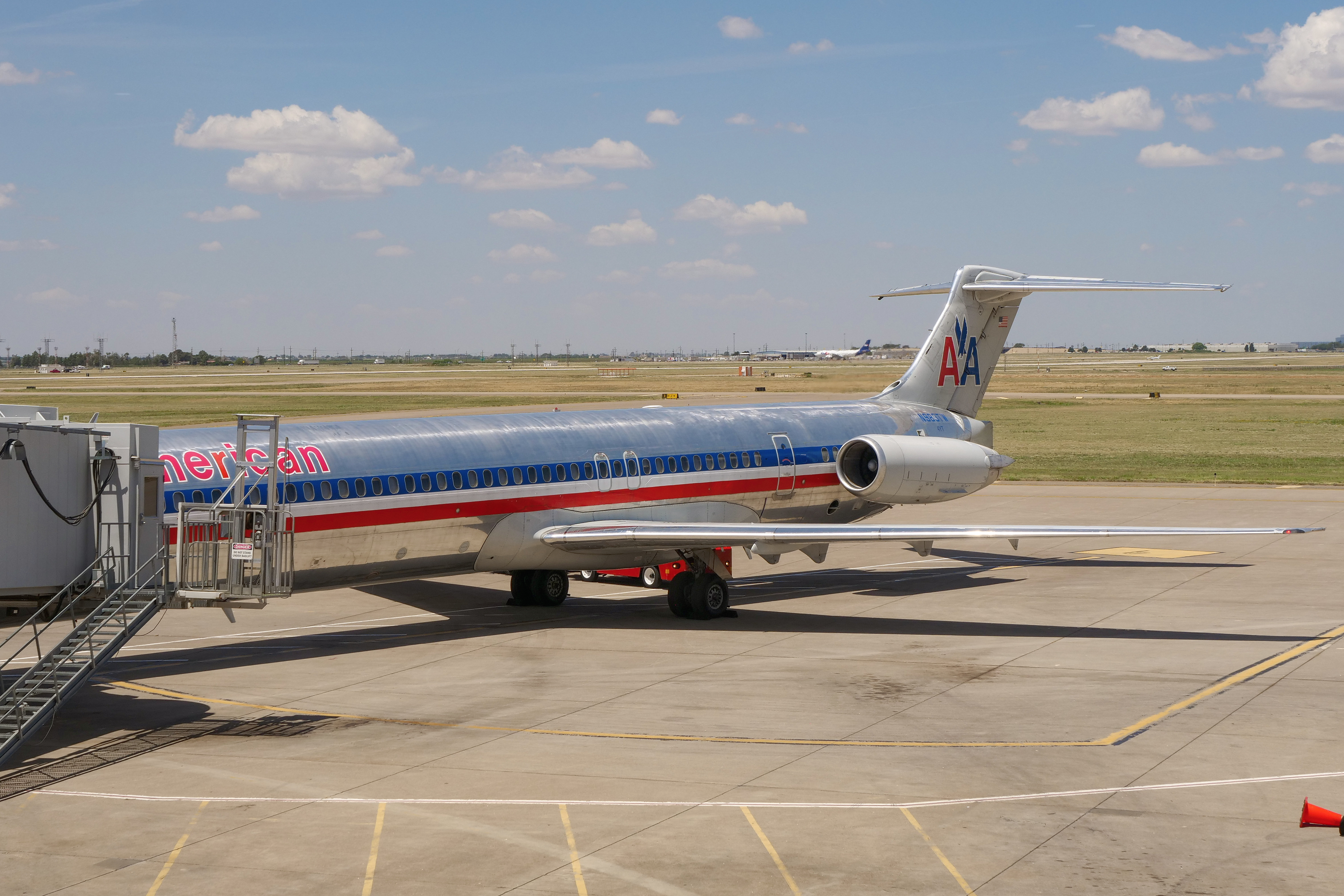
American Airlines MD-83 in Lubbock

Braniff Airways, later to be Braniff International Airways, Continental Airlines, and Pioneer Air Lines all began scheduled passenger flights to Lubbock by 1945. Braniff began with an Amarillo-Lubbock-Dallas route, Continental with a multi-stop route between El Paso and Tulsa, and Pioneer with a multi-stop route between Amarillo and Houston. Pioneer later added flights on a multi-stop route between Albuquerque and Dallas. Pioneer merged into Continental Airlines in 1955 and then Trans-Texas Airways took over the Albuquerque to Dallas route in 1963. By then Continental was flying nonstop to Dallas, Albuquerque, and El Paso however the flight to Tulsa still made stops at Wichita Falls, Lawton, and Oklahoma City. Flights to Houston stopped at Midland/Odessa and San Antonio.

Airline jets arrived in 1965 on Braniff International Airways and 1966 on Continental Airlines. In spring 1966 Braniff BAC One-Elevens flew nonstop to Dallas Love Field and Amarillo, in addition to Lockheed L-188 Electra and Convair 340 flights, while Continental Douglas DC-9-10s flew nonstop to Dallas Love Field and El Paso in addition to Vickers Viscount flights. Trans-Texas Airways became Texas International in 1969 and began jet service with DC-9's on a Denver-Amarillo-Lubbock-Austin-Houston route.

By 1976 all scheduled passenger airline flights at Lubbock were jets: Braniff Boeing 727-100s and Boeing 727-200s, Continental 727-200s and Texas International Airlines Douglas DC-9-10s. A 1976 OAG lists nonstop jets to Lubbock from Albuquerque, Amarillo, Austin, Dallas/Fort Worth (DFW), El Paso, Midland/Odessa and Wichita Falls and direct jets from Colorado Springs, Corpus Christi, Denver, Houston (IAH), Lawton, Los Angeles (LAX), Oklahoma City, San Antonio and Tulsa. Braniff Boeing 727s flew direct from Lubbock to New York Newark Airport, Washington D.C. National Airport and Nashville.

Southwest Airlines began serving Lubbock on May 20, 1977, as an intrastate airline with Boeing 737-200s to Dallas Love Field, Houston Hobby Airport, San Antonio, Corpus Christi and Harlingen. By 1978 Southwest had added nonstop 737 jet flights to El Paso in addition to nonstop jets to Dallas Love Field and Houston Hobby Airport and direct jets to other Texas cities. Flights to Albuquerque were added in 1983. In 1983 Muse Air McDonnell Douglas MD-80s briefly flew nonstop to Dallas Love Field, Houston Hobby Airport and Los Angeles (LAX). Muse Air later merged into Southwest Airlines.

Braniff declared bankruptcy and shut down in 1982. Continental and Texas International merged in late 1982 then Continental left Lubbock in 1983 after declaring bankruptcy as well.

The late 1970s and early 1980s also saw several commuter airlines; Crown Air flew to Clovis and Albuquerque, NM. Air Midwest flew to Roswell, Hobbs, and Carlsbad, NM as well as Oklahoma City. Mesa Airlines also flew to Roswell, Hobbs, and Carlsbad. Permian and Trans Central Airlines both flew to Amarillo and Midland/Odessa.

American Airlines began serving Lubbock in 1981 and Delta Air Lines in 1982, both flying nonstop to Dallas/Fort Worth Airport (DFW) and Amarillo, American with 727-200s and Delta with 737-200s. Delta left Lubbock in 2005 when they discontinued their hub operation at DFW.

Aspen Airways started flying Convair 580s direct from Denver via Amarillo in 1983. This service was later upgraded with BAe 146-100 jets and began operating as United Express in cooperation with United Airlines by 1986. The United Express service to Denver was transferred to Mesa Airlines through much of the 1990s and has been operated by several other regional carriers since then.

In 1987 America West Airlines began flying Boeing 737-200's nonstop from Phoenix, Las Vegas, and Midland/Odessa however this service ended in 1991.

Continental Express, operating on behalf of Continental Airlines, began direct flights to Denver in 1990 with one stop at Amarillo. This service ended in 1994. Continental returned in 1996 with nonstop flights to Houston and this service was later replaced with Embraer 145 regional jets operated by Continental Express. Continental merged into United Airlines in 2012 and United Express continues the service to Houston.

Northwest Airlink, operating on behalf of Northwest Airlines began nonstop service to Memphis in 2009 with Bombardier CRJ100/200 regional jets. Northwest was merged into Delta Air lines in 2010 marking a return to Lubbock for Delta however the service to Memphis ended in 2012.

American Eagle, operating on behalf of American Airlines, began supplementing American's service to DFW in 1990 and began nonstop flights to Phoenix in 2016.

== Facilities ==
The airport covers 3,000 acres (1,200 ha) at an elevation of 3,282 feet (1,000 m). It has three runways: 17R/35L is 11,500 by 150 feet (3,505 by 46 m) concrete; 8/26 is 8,003 by 150 feet (2,439 by 46 m) concrete; 17L/35R is 2,891 by 75 feet (881 by 23 m) asphalt.

In the year ending May 31, 2022 the airport had 92,881 aircraft operations, average 254 per day: 55% general aviation, 17% air taxi, 14% airline, and 14% military. 156 aircraft were then based at this airport: 100 single-engine, 35 multi-engine, 19 jet, and 2 helicopter.

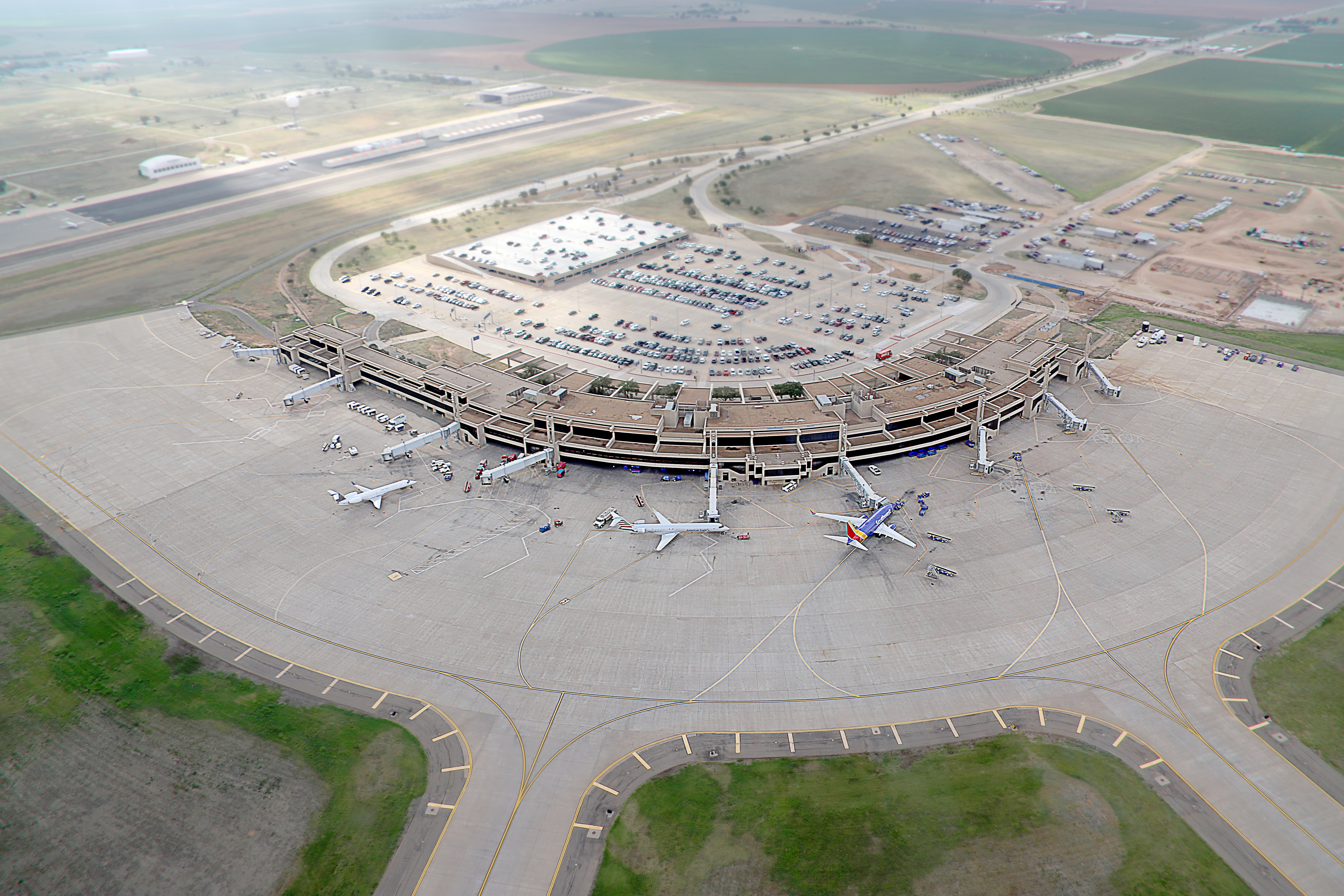
Aerial view of Lubbock Preston Smith International Airport terminal building (2018)

== Airlines and destinations ==
=== Passenger ===
Airlines	Destinations
American Airlines	Dallas/Fort Worth
American Eagle	Dallas/Fort Worth, Phoenix–Sky Harbor
Southwest Airlines	Austin, Dallas–Love, Denver, Houston–Hobby, Las Vegas
United Express	Denver, Houston–Intercontinental

=== Cargo ===
Airlines	Destinations
Ameriflight	Dallas/Fort Worth
FedEx Feeder operated by Baron Aviation Services	Abilene
FedEx Feeder operated by Empire Airlines	Fort Worth/Alliance, Midland/Odessa
FedEx Express	Memphis
UPS Airlines	Louisville

== Statistics ==
=== Top destinations ===
Busiest domestic routes from LBB (April 2025 – March 2026)
Rank	City	Passengers	Carriers
1	Dallas/Fort Worth, Texas	180,050	American
2	Dallas–Love, Texas	157,310	Southwest
3	Houston–Intercontinental, Texas	62,390	United
4	Denver, Colorado	53,160	Southwest, United
5	Las Vegas, Nevada	39,090	Southwest
6	Austin, Texas	33,660	Southwest
7	Phoenix–Sky Harbor, Arizona	19,600	American
8	Houston–Hobby, Texas	13,050	Southwest

=== Airline market share ===
Largest airlines at LBB (April 2025 – March 2026)
Rank	Airline	Passengers	Share
1	Southwest Airlines	544,000	48.36%
2	Envoy Air	208,000	18.47%
3	SkyWest Airlines	141,000	12.59%
4	American Airlines	99,510	8.85%
5	CommuteAir	80,730	7.18%
	Other	50,990	4.54%

== Accidents and incidents ==
- On July 8, 1962 Vickers Viscount N243V of Continental Airlines was damaged beyond economic repair when the propellers struck the runway shortly after take-off. A wheels-up landing was made in a wheat field.
- On January 27, 2009, Empire Airlines Flight 8284, an ATR 42 under contract from FedEx Express, crashed on landing at Lubbock Preston Smith International Airport at 04:37 CT. The plane, which had been traveling from Fort Worth Alliance Airport, landed short of the touchdown zone and skidded off the runway amid light freezing rain. There was a small fire on the plane and two crew members were taken to hospital with minor injuries.
- On February 4, 2015, a Piper PA-46, during the landing approach, struck a KCBD transmitter 8 miles south of the airport. The sole occupant was killed.
- On October 26, 2020, a Cessna 210 crashed 5 miles short of the runway while attempting to land in adverse weather. The pilot and sole occupant of the aircraft was killed in the accident.

== See also ==
- List of airports in Texas
- Texas World War II Army Airfields
- Silent Wings Museum
