= FlyHawaii Airlines =

Hawaiian Airline

FlyHawaii Airlines was a proposed low-cost airline that would have provided inter-island flight service in the Hawaiian Islands. The company, which was founded by Lion Coffee founder James Delano planned to begin service in late 2005 or early 2006.

FlyHawaii hoped to succeed where predecessors such as Discovery Airways and Mahalo Air had failed by following the blueprint of low-cost carriers like Southwest Airlines and JetBlue Airways, which offer frequent flights and depend heavily on Internet bookings. The airline planned to charge fares in the $50 to $60 range.

Following the September 2005 announcement by Mesa Air Group that it intended to start its own inter-island carrier, go!, using 50-seat jet aircraft, its primary investor, a group that included America Online founder Steve Case, decided against buying into the carrier. Other potential investors also elected to wait to gauge Mesa's impact on the market and await the results of Aloha Airlines then-current Chapter 11 bankruptcy reorganization. In late November 2005, FlyHawaii laid off its staff and shut down.

== Fleet ==
FlyHawaii planned to operate ATR 72 turboprop aircraft carrying approximately 68 passengers. Service would have started with an initial fleet of four or five aircraft, expanding ultimately to about a dozen aircraft.

== See also ==
- List of defunct airlines of the United States
