= Empire Airlines =

Airline of the United States

IATA	ICAO	Call sign
EM	CFS	EMPIRE AIR
- Founded: 1977; 49 years ago
- AOC #: COEA135A
- Hubs: Spokane International Airport; Coeur d'Alene Airport
- Focus cities: Seattle Tacoma International Airport
- Fleet size: 54
- Headquarters: Hayden, Idaho, U.S.
- Key people: Robert Henrich (CFO) Scott Marikis (President); Tim Komberec (CEO)
- Employees: 300 (2024)
- Website: empireairlines.com

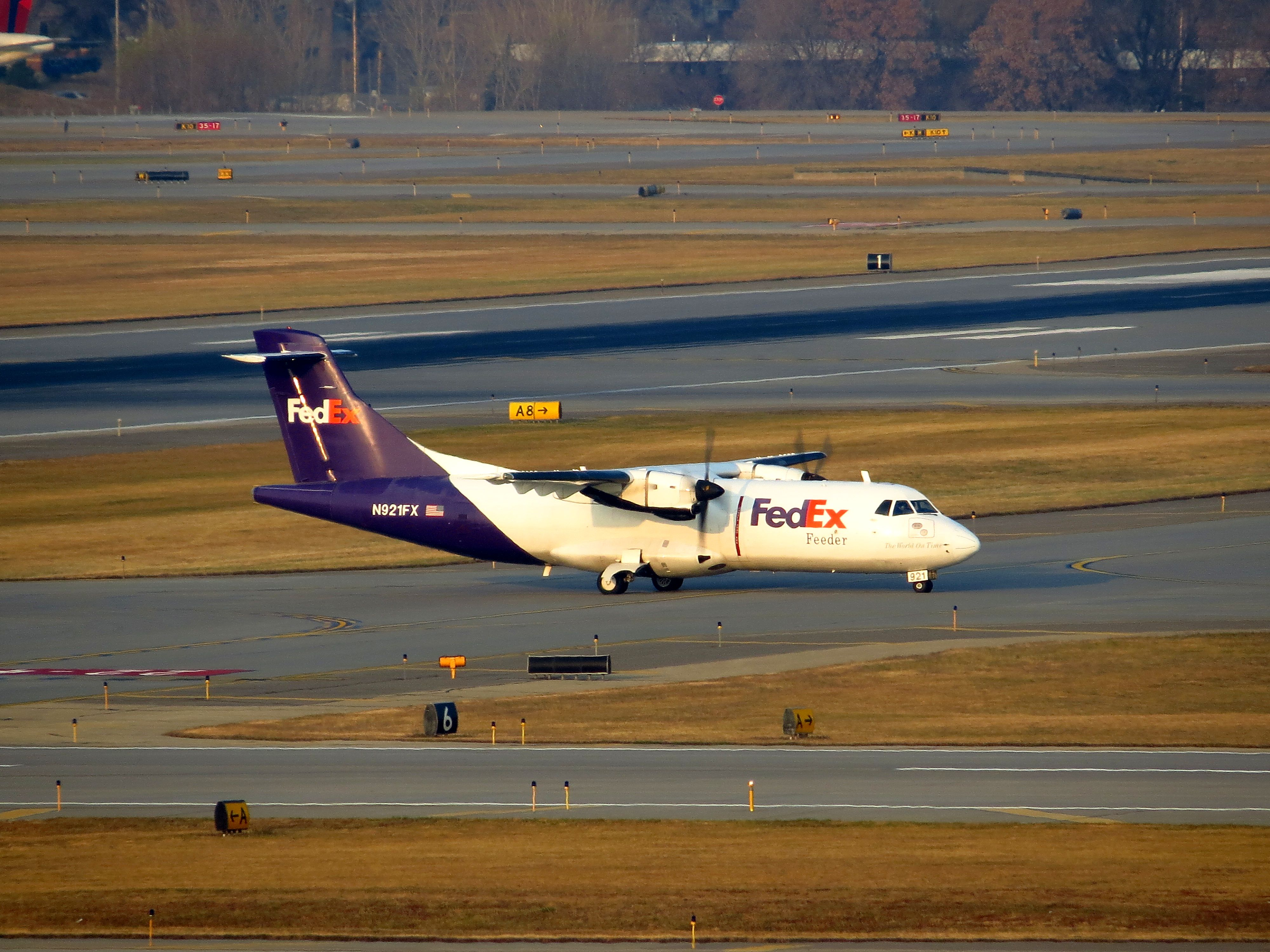
Empire ATR 42 in FedEx Feeder livery

Empire Airlines is a cargo and former passenger airline based in Hayden, Idaho, near Coeur d'Alene. It operates over 120 scheduled cargo flights a day in 18 US states and Canada. Empire also operated passenger service within Hawaii, under the name "Ohana by Hawaiian", between 2014 and 2021 in partnership with Hawaiian Airlines. Its main base is Coeur d'Alene Airport with a hub at Spokane International Airport. The company slogan is We Can Do That.

== History ==
Empire Airlines was established and started operations in May 1977 in Orofino as a charter company. Originally named Clearwater Flying Service (thus the CFS identifier for its flights), it was purchased by Nick Chenoweth and Vick Walters on April 12. Soon thereafter, a third partner, Mel Spelde joined as a flight instructor. Clearwater Flying Service made a living doing several different things including, fire patrol, transporting outfitters into the backcountry, air ambulance, air pollution monitoring, charters and flight instruction.

On November 1, 1980, Empire Airlines purchased West Aire, Inc. at Coeur d'Alene and expanded business to include aircraft sales and maintenance. In 1981 Empire purchased Executive Aviation in Missoula, Montana, and leased Twin Otter aircraft for United States Forest Service smoke jumping contracts. In December 1983 and January 1984, Empire was awarded government contracts to transport people and materiel in Grenada, following the conflict. In the mid-1980s, Empire received contracts from several places including, a Colorado ski destination, Hughes Aircraft, and Naval Arctic Research Laboratory. In 1988 Empire signed a FedEx Express contract to fly and maintain Cessna 208 Caravan aircraft out of Portland and Spokane; Seattle was added in September. In 1989 Empire became a FAR 121 operator after the purchase of Pacific Alaska Airlines and two Fairchild F-27 aircraft. In August Empire started F27 services for FedEx Express.

In 1990, Empire added more cargo routes and performed its first heavy maintenance check on a Fairchild F-27. By 1992, the airline was operating British Aerospace BAe 146-200 jet aircraft on contract charter flights for Silverwing Holidays from Bellingham, WA and Spokane to Los Angeles, Palm Springs, Phoenix and Reno. In 1993, Empire became a sustaining member of CASE (Coordinating Agency for Supplier Evaluation). From October 1993 to May 1994, it operated Fokker F27-500 aircraft in Hawaii on behalf of Mahalo Air, while the latter airline was awaiting its own operating certificate. In 1995, Empire moved corporate offices and ended passenger services, focusing on cargo, maintenance and airline startups. Empire began sending technical reps to Conair during heavy maintenance checks on Fokker F27 Friendships. In 1998, Empire started flying and maintaining Short 360 aircraft. Empire entered into a partnership agreement to begin Express Air serving FedEx in Europe.

In 2001, Empire received a Repair Station certificate. In 2002, Empire purchased Reliant Logistics as a wholly owned subsidiary. In 2003, The first ATR 42 aircraft arrived in Spokane for cargo conversion. In 2004, the first ATR 42 put on Empire's certificate made the first ATR FedEx Feeder revenue flight. In 2005, Empire moved into new hangar and office building, in Hayden, Idaho, adjacent to the Coeur d'Alene airport (COE). In 2013, Empire Airlines began drone flights under the name "Empire Unmanned", mainly serving agriculture and mining industries in the Western U.S.

On December 31, 2021, Empire Airlines acquired fellow FedEx feeder West Air, expanding its footprint to include all of California.

== 'Ohana by Hawaiian service ==
In December 2012, it was announced that Empire would begin operating three ATR 42-500 series propjet aircraft acquired by Hawaiian Airlines on routes within the state of Hawaii. 'Ohana by Hawaiian launched initial service to Molokai Airport (MKK) on March 11, 2014, and Lana'i Airport on March 18, 2014.

In 2015, Hawaiian Airlines announced a new all-cargo freighter service to be operated by Empire with ATR 72 turboprop aircraft on interisland routes in Hawaii

Hawaiian Airlines suspended all 'Ohana by Hawaiian service on January 14, 2021, during the COVID-19 pandemic.

On May 27, 2021, Hawaiian announced that it would discontinue the ʻOhana by Hawaiian brand and its cargo and passenger services after the pandemic and resulting quarantine significantly impacted interisland travel. The interruptions in service forced the airline to reconsider the viability of operation and determine it was no longer feasible. The carrier's ATR fleet would be moved to the mainland and be prepared for sale.

== Previous passenger service ==
Empire operated scheduled passenger flights during the early 1990s in the Pacific Northwest with Fairchild F-27 and Fairchild Swearingen Metroliner "Metro II" turboprop aircraft. In 1993, the airline was serving Boise, ID (BOI), Coeur d'Alene, ID (COE), Lewiston, ID (LWS), Olympia, WA (OLM) and Spokane, WA (GEG). Empire previously served Seattle (SEA) as well.

Initial scheduled service was between Boise and Coeur d'Alene, ID utilizing Cessna 441 Conquest II turboprop aircraft. Lewiston, ID was added as an enroute stop later; then the Swearingen Metro II came along.

In May 1993, Empire's network included Boise, Lewiston, and Coeur d'Alene, ID; Portland and Astoria, OR; and Spokane, Pasco, Olympia, Seattle, and Hoquiam, WA. This was the third time Seattle had been served. Prior to the Metro propjets being introduced and new service to Lewiston, Empire had served Seattle and Missoula with the Cessna Conquest turboprop from Coeur d'Alene.

== Fleet ==
As of July 2024, the Empire Airlines fleet includes the following aircraft:

Empire Air fleet
Aircraft	In service	Orders	Notes
ATR 42-320F	7		(as of August 2025)
ATR 72-212F	5		(as of August 2025)
ATR 72-600F	2		(as of August 2025)
Cessna 208B Super Cargomaster	34		
Cessna 408F	6		(as of August 2025)
Total	54		

=== Previously operated ===
Empire Air formerly operated the following aircraft:

- ATR 42-300F
- British Aerospace BAe 146-200 - only jet aircraft type operated by the airline
- Cessna 441 Conquest II
- de Havilland Canada DHC-6 Twin Otter
- Fairchild F-27
- Fairchild Swearingen Metroliner "Metro II"
- Fokker F27 Friendship (series -500 and -600 aircraft operated for FedEx in cargo operations and series -500 aircraft for Mahalo Air in scheduled passenger operations)
- Short 360

== Accidents and incidents ==
- January 5, 1982: Empire Airlines Flight 141, Piper PA-31, a scheduled commuter fight between Utica, New York, and Washington, D.C., crashed while attempting an approach to Tompkins County Airport, Ithaca, New York, an en route stop. The flight crew contacted Elmira approach control and had received instructions for an instrument landing system (ILS) approach to runway 32 at Tompkins County Airport. The copilot declared an emergency stating that the airplane had a landing flap problem; he later stated that only one flap was down. He also stated that they were not able to maintain altitude and that the airplane was descending. The last radio transmission was recorded five minutes later. The airplane crashed in a wooded area near three suburban residences. The pilot and copilot, the only persons aboard, were killed. There were no injuries to personnel on the ground. The airplane was destroyed by impact and postimpact fire. The National Transportation Safety Board determined that the probable cause of the accident was excessive wear of the left flap motor/flexible drive spline and certification of the airplane with a flap system that did not meet the requirements of Civil Air Regulation 3.339. The worn spline caused a split flap condition of 34° that resulted in marginal flight control authority. Moderate low altitude turbulence and transient low level wind shear may have contributed to the upset and loss of control.
- January 11, 1995: A Cessna 208 Caravan leased by FedEx Express and flying a cargo flight from Flagstaff to Phoenix Sky Harbor International Airport crashed about 1.3 miles SSE of Flagstaff Pulliam Airport. While returning to the airport, the "fuel selector off" warning horn was heard. The pilot was killed. The cause of the crash was determined to be the pilot's failure to properly configure the fuel system prior to takeoff.
- October 9, 2000: Flight 665, a Cessna 208 Caravan on a VFR cargo flight from Bellingham to Orcas Island crashed on Lummi Island. The pilot onboard was killed. The cause of the crash was determined to be the pilot flying into adverse weather and not maintaining proper terrain clearance.

Reconstruction of the final minutes of Empire Flight 8284 (NTSB simulation)

- December 24, 2005: An Empire Airlines Cessna 208B Caravan on a VFR cargo flight from Portland, Oregon to Roseburg, Oregon crashed shortly after takeoff on a golf course south of the Portland International Airport at 7:43 AM PT. The cause of the crash was determined to be a partial loss of engine power for an undetermined reason during the initial takeoff climb resulting in an in-flight collision with objects.
- On 27 January 2009, Flight 8284, an ATR-42-320 cargo plane under contract from FedEx Express crashed on landing at Lubbock Preston Smith International Airport at 04:37 CT. The plane, which had been traveling from Fort Worth Alliance Airport, landed short of the touchdown zone and skidded off the runway amid light freezing rain. There was a small fire on the plane and two crew members were taken to the hospital with minor injuries.
