= Mahalo Air =

Hawaiian Airline

IATA	ICAO	Call sign
8M	MLH	MAHALO
- Founded: 1993; 32 years ago
- Ceased operations: 1997; 28 years ago
- Hubs: Honolulu International Airport
- Destinations: 5
- Headquarters: Honolulu CDP, City and County of Honolulu
- Website: www.islander-magazine.com/mahaloschedule.html

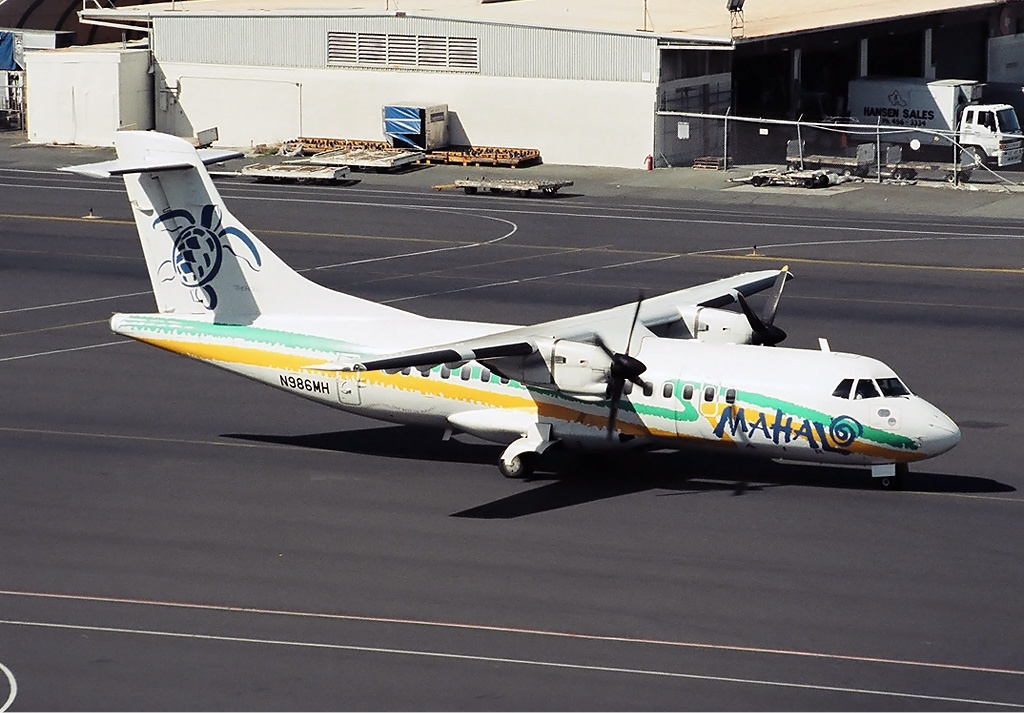
Mahalo Air ATR 42 in 1995

Mahalo Air was an airline that provided inter-island service within the state of Hawaii between 1993 and 1997. The airline started service on October 4, 1993, using Fokker F27 turboprop aircraft operated by Empire Airlines while awaiting its own certification. On May 31, 1994, the agreement with Empire ran out, shutting down the airline. In October of that year, the airline resumed operations with its own certificate, using new ATR-42 turboprops. During the summer of 1997, the airline filed for Chapter 11 bankruptcy protection, and ceased operations on September 2. The airline was headquartered in Honolulu.

== Destinations ==
- Honolulu (Honolulu International Airport)
- Kahului (Kahului Airport)
- Kapalua (Kapalua Airport)
- Kaunakakai (Molokai Airport)
- Kona (Kona International Airport)
- Lihue (Lihue Airport)

== Fleet ==
Mahalo Air fleet
Aircraft	Total	Passengers (First/Economy)	Notes
Fokker F27-500	3		Operated by Empire Airlines; Replaced by ATR-42
ATR-42-300	8	0/48	
ATR-42-320	5	0/44	

== See also ==
- List of defunct airlines of the United States
