= Kāʻanapali, Hawaii =

Kāʻanapali
- Census-designated place
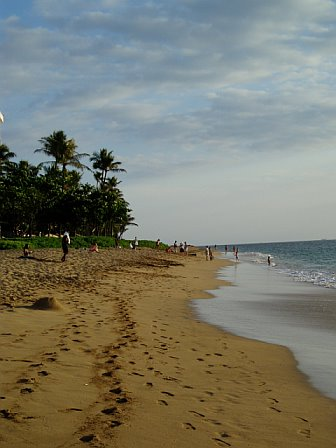
- Beach

- Location in Maui County and the state of Hawaii
- Coordinates: 20°56′5″N 156°40′46″W
- Country: United States
- State: Hawaii
- County: Maui

Area
  - Total: 6.34 sq mi (16.41 km^{2})
  - Land: 5.00 sq mi (12.96 km^{2})
  - Water: 1.33 sq mi (3.45 km^{2})
- Elevation: 0 ft (0 m)

Population (2020)
  - Total: 1,161
  - Density: 232.0/sq mi (89.59/km^{2})
- Time zone: UTC-10 (Hawaii-Aleutian)
- ZIP code: 96761
- Area code: 808
- FIPS code: 15-20000
- GNIS feature ID: 0359603

Kāʻanapali (Hawaiian for 'Kāʻana cliff') is a planned resort community in Maui County, Hawaii, United States, on the island of Maui located in the Old Hawaii ahupuaa of Hanakaʻōʻō, as in the same name of Hanakaʻōʻō Canoe Beach at the southern end of Kāʻanapali Beach. The population was 1,161 at the 2020 census. For statistical purposes, the United States Census Bureau has defined Kāʻanapali as a census-designated place (CDP).

== Geography ==
According to the United States Census Bureau, the CDP has a total area of 6.3 square miles (16.3 km^{2}), of which 4.9 square miles (12.8 km^{2}) is land and 1.3 square miles (3.4 km^{2}), or 21.19%, is water.

=== Climate ===
According to the Köppen climate classification, Kāʻanapali has a semi-arid, tropical type of climate (BSh), with warm winters and hot summers.

The north end of Kāʻanapali has more annual rainfall than the south end, as it sits on the microclimate transition of west Maui: the historic town of Lahaina is a few miles south and receives half the annual rainfall, while the annual rainfalls doubles just a few miles north in Napili and Kapalua.

Climate data for Kaanapali (1991–2020 normals, extremes 1986–present)
Month	Jan	Feb	Mar	Apr	May	Jun	Jul	Aug	Sep	Oct	Nov	Dec	Year
Record high °F (°C)	88 (31)	88 (31)	87 (31)	87 (31)	91 (33)	89 (32)	93 (34)	95 (35)	91 (33)	92 (33)	93 (34)	90 (32)	95 (35)
Mean daily maximum °F (°C)	76.5 (24.7)	76.8 (24.9)	77.6 (25.3)	79.3 (26.3)	80.9 (27.2)	83.4 (28.6)	84.1 (28.9)	84.8 (29.3)	84.8 (29.3)	83.4 (28.6)	80.4 (26.9)	77.6 (25.3)	80.8 (27.1)
Daily mean °F (°C)	70.3 (21.3)	70.3 (21.3)	71.2 (21.8)	72.5 (22.5)	74.0 (23.3)	76.4 (24.7)	77.1 (25.1)	77.7 (25.4)	77.5 (25.3)	76.4 (24.7)	74.3 (23.5)	71.8 (22.1)	74.1 (23.4)
Mean daily minimum °F (°C)	64.1 (17.8)	63.8 (17.7)	64.7 (18.2)	65.7 (18.7)	67.1 (19.5)	69.4 (20.8)	70.1 (21.2)	70.6 (21.4)	70.3 (21.3)	69.5 (20.8)	68.2 (20.1)	66.0 (18.9)	67.5 (19.7)
Record low °F (°C)	50 (10)	47 (8)	52 (11)	59 (15)	59 (15)	60 (16)	59 (15)	64 (18)	61 (16)	62 (17)	61 (16)	59 (15)	47 (8)
Average rainfall inches (mm)	3.41 (87)	2.12 (54)	3.69 (94)	1.74 (44)	1.22 (31)	0.64 (16)	0.79 (20)	0.90 (23)	1.18 (30)	1.88 (48)	2.57 (65)	3.19 (81)	23.33 (593)
Average rainy days (≥ 0.01 in)	7.2	7.7	9.0	7.4	6.0	4.8	5.8	5.2	4.6	6.1	8.4	10.6	82.8
Source: NOAA

Climate data for Kaanapali
Month	Jan	Feb	Mar	Apr	May	Jun	Jul	Aug	Sep	Oct	Nov	Dec	Year
Average sea temperature °F (°C)	76.5 (24.7)	76.3 (24.6)	75.9 (24.4)	76.8 (24.9)	77.5 (25.3)	78.4 (25.8)	78.6 (25.9)	79.5 (26.4)	80.2 (26.8)	79.7 (26.5)	78.6 (25.9)	77.2 (25.1)	77.9 (25.5)
Mean daily daylight hours	11.0	11.0	12.0	13.0	13.0	13.0	13.0	13.0	12.0	12.0	11.0	11.0	12.1
Average Ultraviolet index	7	9	11	11	11	11+	11+	11+	11	9	7	6	9.6
Source: Weather Atlas

== Demographics ==
Historical population
Census	Pop.	Note	%±
2020	1,161		—
U.S. Decennial Census

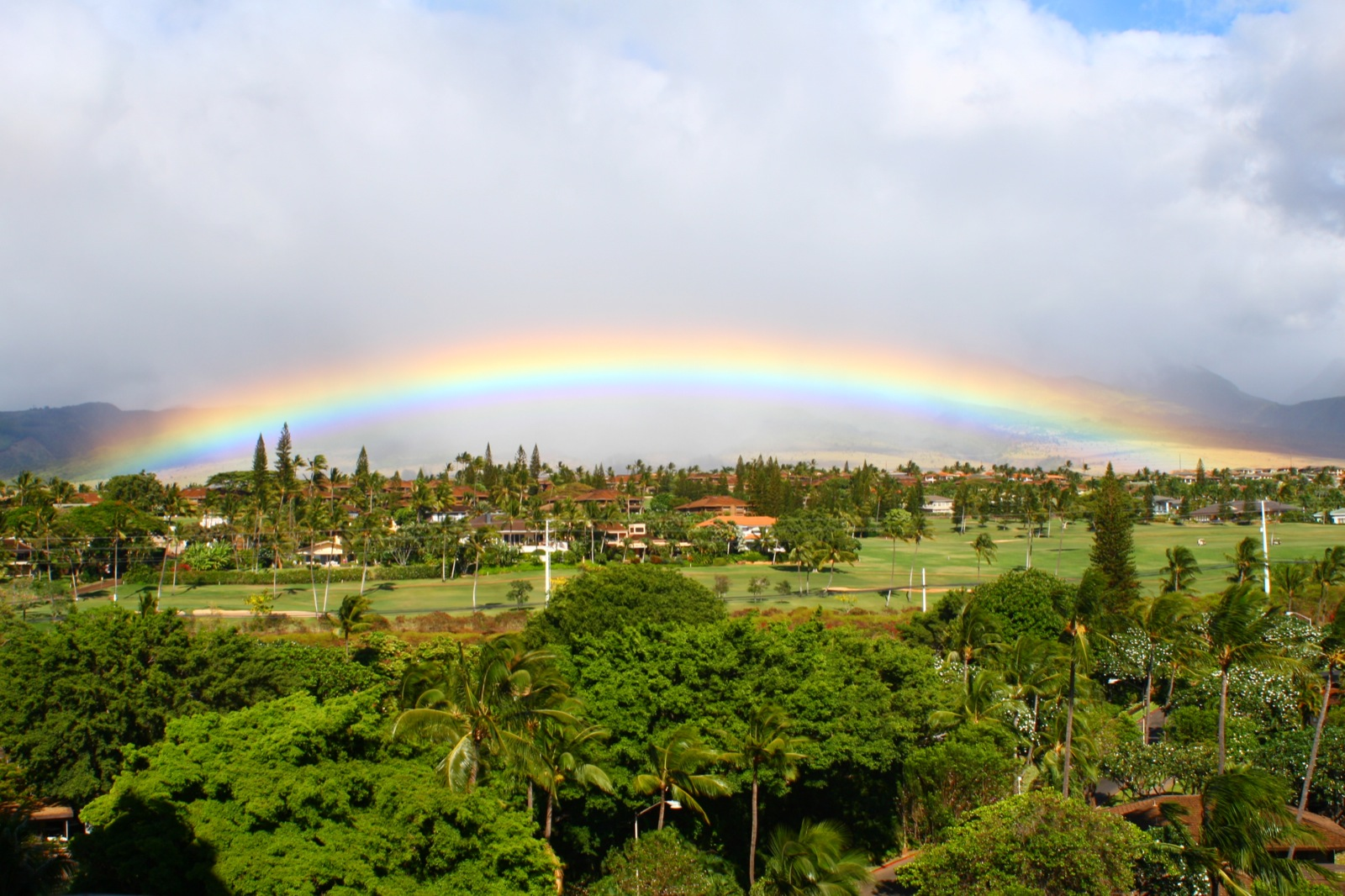
Rainbow on the grounds of the Royal Lahaina Hotel

As of the census of 2000, there were 1,375 people, 537 households, and 380 families residing in the CDP. The population density was 282.8 inhabitants per square mile (109.2/km^{2}). There were 1,775 housing units at an average density of 365.1 per square mile (141.0/km^{2}). The racial makeup of the CDP was 79.07% White, 0.95% African American, 0.15% Native American, 17.42% Asian, 3.04% Pacific Islander, 1.96% from other races, and 7.42% from two or more races. Hispanic or Latino of any race were 0.55% of the population.

There were 537 households, out of which 20.5% had children under the age of 18 living with them, 59.4% were married couples living together, 7.3% had a female householder with no husband present, and 29.1% were non-families. 16.6% of all households were made up of individuals, and 6.0% had someone living alone who was 65 years of age or older. The average household size was 2.56 and the average family size was 2.73.

In the CDP the population was spread out, with 16.3% under the age of 18, 3.4% from 18 to 24, 30.6% from 25 to 44, 33.8% from 45 to 64, and 15.9% who were 65 years of age or older. The median age was 45 years. For every 100 females, there were 111.5 males. For every 100 females age 18 and over, there were 113.5 males.

The median income for a household in the CDP was $79,288, and the median income for a family was $86,647. Males had a median income of $48,393 versus $41,625 for females. The per capita income for the CDP was $48,506. About 1.6% of families and 2.7% of the population were below the poverty line, including none of those under the age of eighteen or sixty-five or over.

== History ==
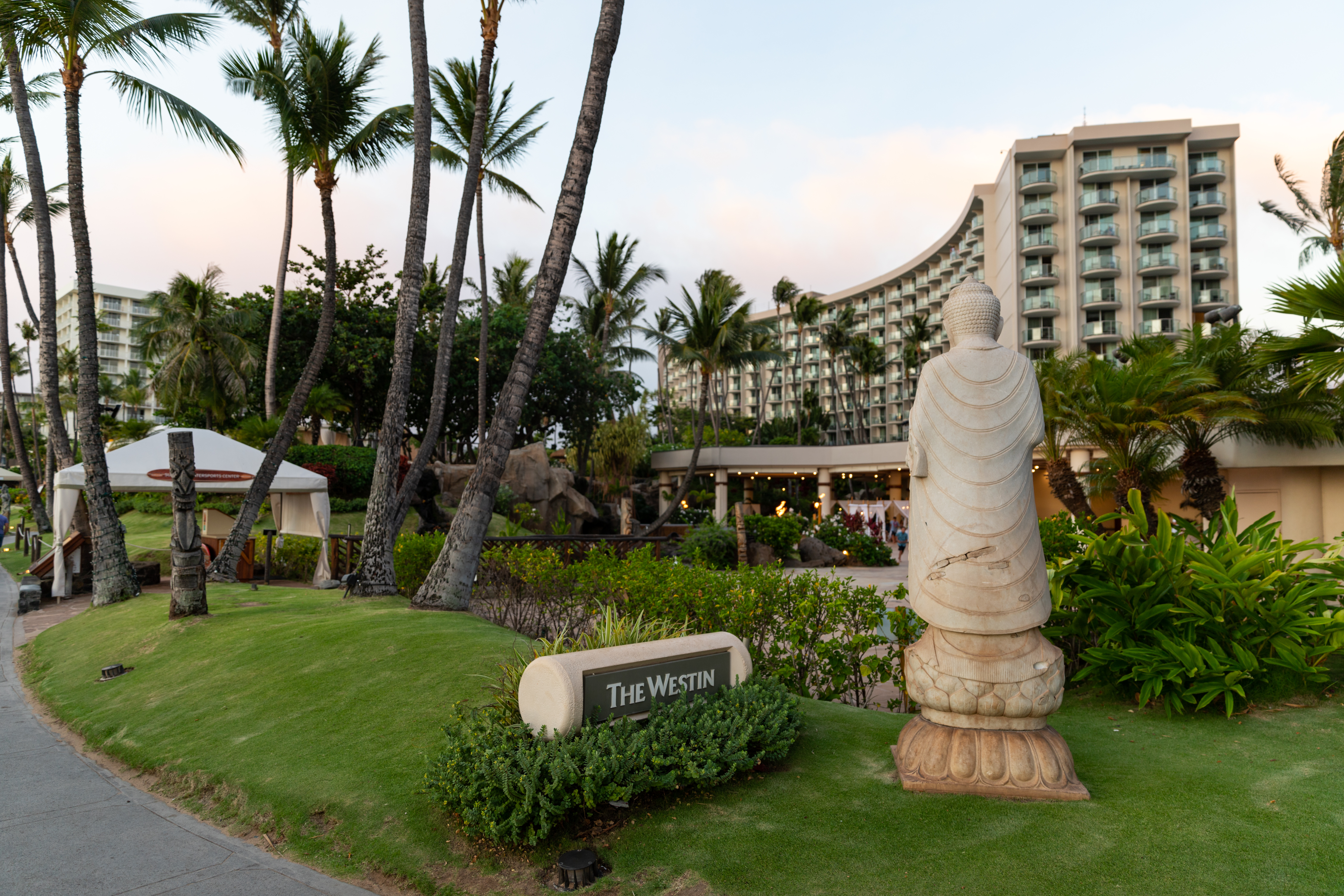
The Westin resort in Kaanapali, Maui, Hawaii

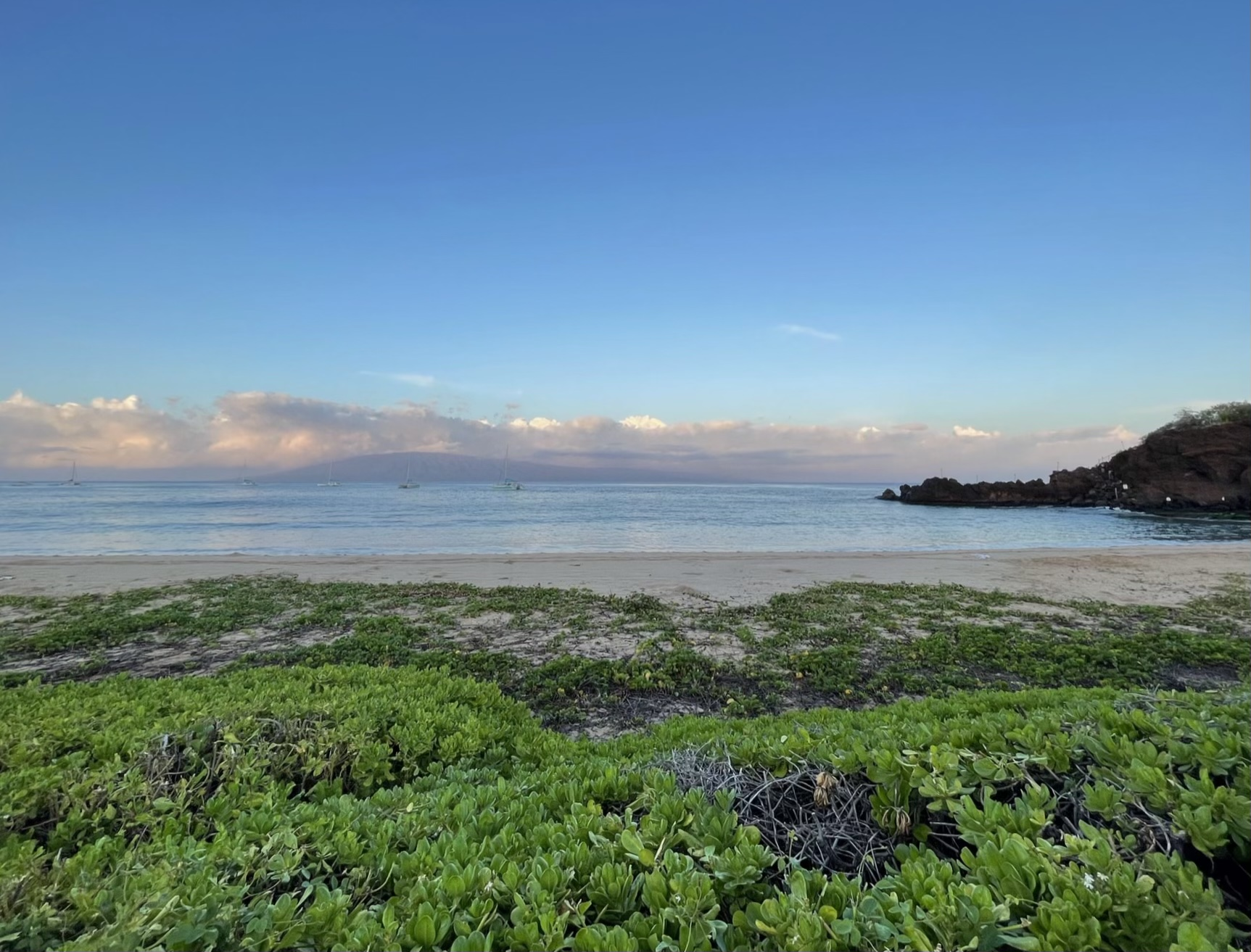
Beach in Kaanapali Beach on western shore of Maui, Hawaii

Amfac, Inc. started to develop Kaanapali Beach Resort in the 1960s, on mile-long Kaanapali Beach on the western shore of Maui, a couple miles north of the old whaling town of Lahaina. Since that time, many more hotels and condos have been built both on Kaanapali Beach and for several miles up and down the coast, and Lahaina has turned into a tourist shopping area.

Major resort hotels now on Kaanapali Beach (in order from the south end closest to Lahaina to the north end) are the Hyatt Regency Maui (opened in 1980), Maui Marriott (opened 1982, now turned into timeshares), Westin Maui Resort & Spa (originally opened as the Maui Surf in 1971, then rebuilt as the Westin 1987), Outrigger Kaanapali Beach Hotel (1964), Sheraton Maui Resort & Spa (1963 but completely rebuilt in 1996), Royal Lahaina (1962), and Aston Maui Kaanapali Villas (originally a Hilton when it opened in 1963 and sometime referred to as Hale Kaanapali).

There are also condominium complexes on Kaanapali Beach. Toward Lahaina between the Marriott and the Westin is the Alii. Moving further north on Kaanapali beach between Whalers Village (shopping center) and the Kaanapali Beach Hotel, is the Whaler. On the north side of Kaanapali Beach (north of Black Rock) there are two new complexes. The Westin Ka'anapali Ocean Resort Villas is a vacation ownership resort, with South Phase opened in September 2003 and North Phase opened in July 2007. The Honua Kai condominium complex is just south of the Aston Mahana condominiums (formerly ResortQuest Hawaii) and Ka'anapali Beach Club.

== Airports ==
The Kapalua-West Maui Airport is a small regional airport that serves West Maui, including Kaanapali, Lahaina, Kapalua and Napili-Honokowai. The airport has been in service since 1987.

From 1965 to 1986, Kaanapali had its own airport located in the Kaanapali North Beach area, which was developed as The Westin Ka'anapali Ocean Resort Villas and Honua Kai condo complex.
