= Kaanapali Airport =

Kaanapali Airport Kahua Mokulele o Kāʻanapali
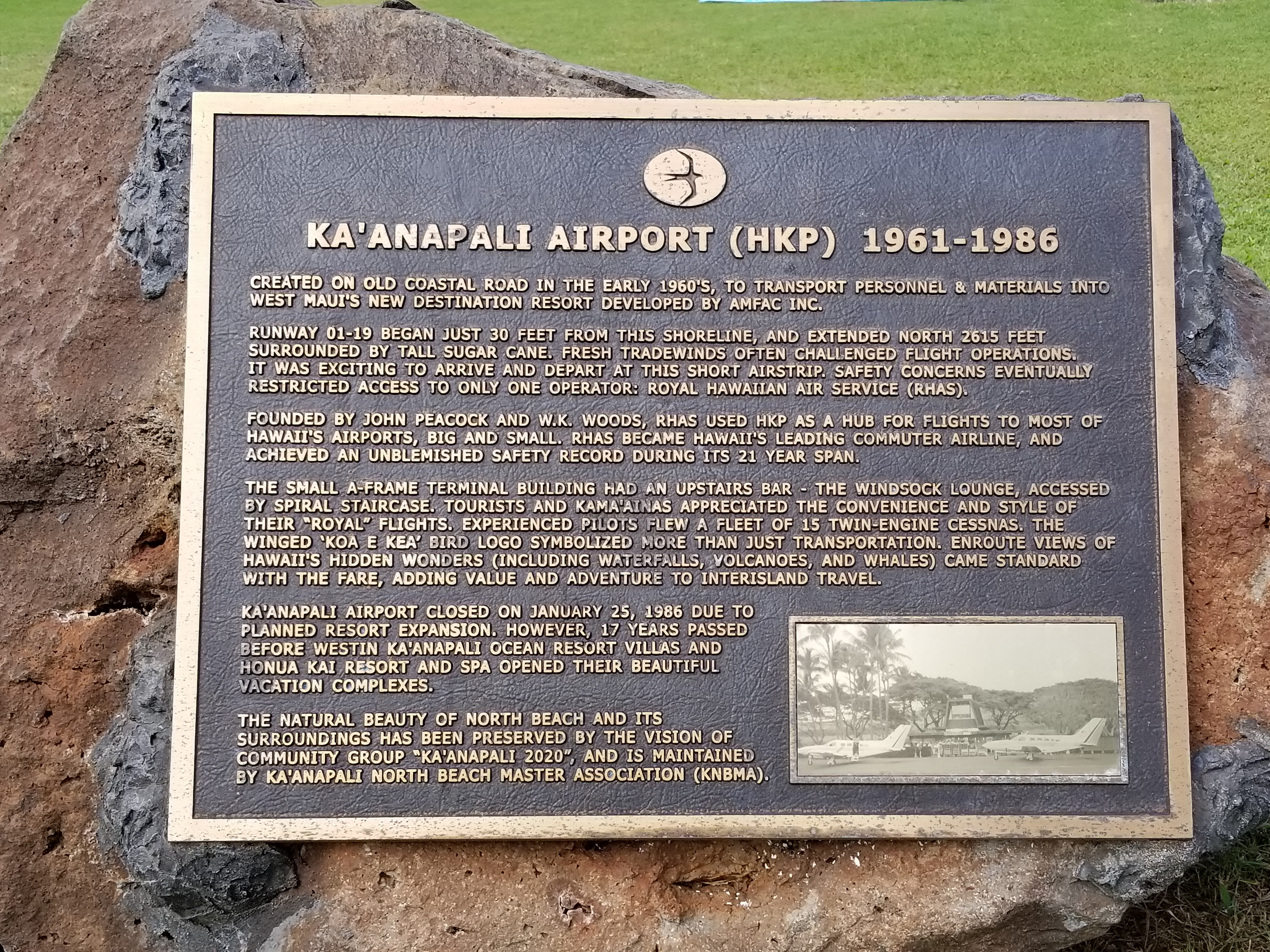
- Memorial plaque
- IATA: HKP; ICAO: PHKP

Summary
- Airport type: Private
- Operator: Royal Hawaiian Air Service
- Location: Honokōwai, Hawaii
- Closed: 1986
- Built: 1961
- In use: 1965-1986
- Elevation AMSL: 3 ft / 1 m
- Coordinates: 20°56′36″N 156°41′24″W
- Interactive map of Kaanapali Airport

Runways
Direction	Length		Surface
Direction	ft	m	Surface
1/19	2,300	701	?

Kaanapali Airport was a small regional airport located on the northwest end of Maui, near the city of Lahaina and north of Kaanapali Beach in Honokōwai. The airport serviced West Maui between 1965 and its closure in 1986.

== History ==
The exact date of the airport's construction is unknown, but was presumably built to transport workers to develop Kaanapali into a resort by Amfac, Inc. around 1961. It was not shown on the 1961 USGS topographic map.

== Commercial airline service ==
Royal Hawaiian Air Service was the only commuter airline authorized to use the airport, although Federal Express also used it. According to one private pilot, the airport "had no markings to indicate that it was restricted or private use only, (but when) my wife and I landed a rented Piper Cherokee on this airstrip in August 1970 while on our honeymoon... we were not well received and were politely but firmly asked to leave." The airport was one of the most challenging locations to fly because of its short 2,700-foot (820 m) runway, which began just beyond Kaanapali Beach and cut a narrow swath through high green sugarcane fields. Because the airport was near the edge of a wind shadow, where the West Maui Mountains shielded the airport from the trade winds, the winds at the airport could range from calm to breezy depending on the wind direction.

Around 1983, Royal Hawaiian acquired two STOL capable de Havilland Canada DHC-6 Twin Otter turboprop aircraft, which flew nearly exclusively on the Honolulu to Kaanapali route. While the aircraft carried more passengers than the Cessna 402 twin prop aircraft that the airline routinely operated, they were vulnerable to gusty winds and would not be used on the Kaanapali Airport route on particularly windy days.

== Airport closure ==
In 1986, the airport was closed to make room for a planned hotel project. A new airport was built by Hawaiian Airlines inland of the Hawaii Route 30 on land of the Maui Land & Pineapple Company. It was named the Kapalua-West Maui Airport in recognition of the Kapalua Resort owned by the same parent company. The beach front of the old airfield site is now the new Honua Kai condominium complex, as well as the Westin Kaanapali Ocean Resort Villas timeshare complex. Public access is via the small Aliʻi Kahekili Nui Ahumanu Beach Park, known as Airport Beach.

On March 1, 1987, Hawaiian Airlines initiated service West Maui at the new airport with 50-seat, STOL capable de Havilland Canada DHC-7 Dash 7 turboprop aircraft. Royal Hawaiian Air Service ceased operations soon afterward, as its service from the Kaanapali Airport had been its main profit source.
