= Kapalua Airport =

Airport in Kapalua, Hawaii, United States

Kapalua Airport Kahua Mokulele o Kapalua
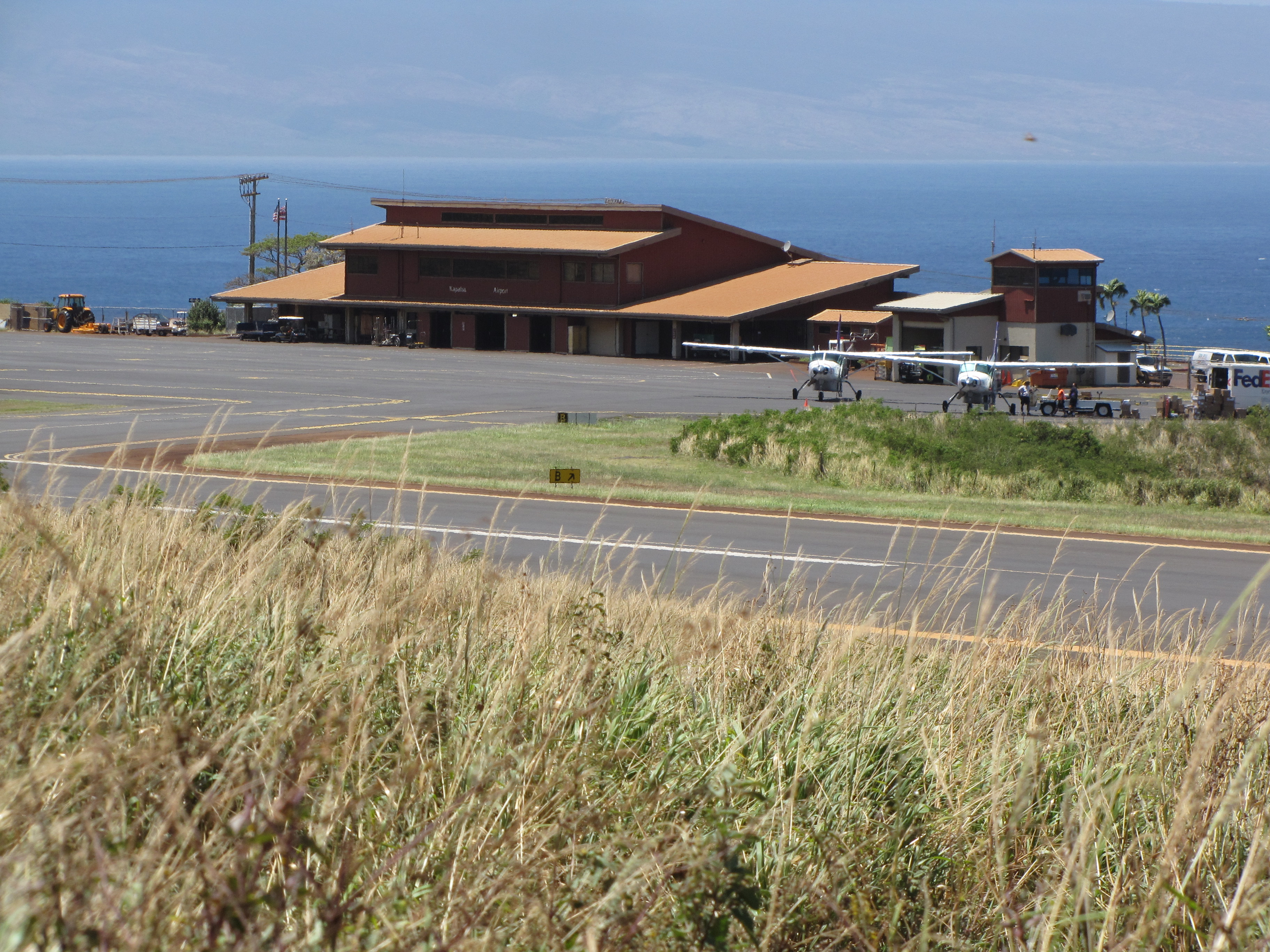
- Kapalua Airport, April 2011
- IATA: JHM; ICAO: PHJH; FAA LID: JHM

Summary
- Airport type: Public
- Owner/Operator: Hawaii Department of Transportation
- Serves: Lahaina, Hawaii
- Elevation AMSL: 256 ft (78 m)
- Coordinates: 20°57′47″N 156°40′23″W
- Website: hawaii.gov/jhm

Map
- Interactive map of Kapalua Airport

Runways
Direction	Length		Surface
Direction	ft	m	Surface
2/20	3,000	914	Asphalt

Statistics (2004)
- Aircraft operations: 9,990
- Source: Federal Aviation Administration

Kapalua Airport (IATA: JHM, ICAO: PHJH, FAA LID: JHM), also known as Kapalua–West Maui Airport, is a regional airport in the district of Mahinahina, on the west side of Maui island in the state of Hawaii. It is located five nautical miles (9.3 km; 5.8 mi) north of Lahaina, in Maui County. Most flights to Kapalua Airport originate from commuter airports on the other Hawaiian islands by commercial commuter services, unscheduled air taxis, and general aviation.

As per Federal Aviation Administration records, the airport had 52,328 passenger boardings (enplanements) in calendar year 2008, 42,416 enplanements in 2009, and 40,060 in 2010. It is included in the Federal Aviation Administration (FAA) National Plan of Integrated Airport Systems for 2017–2021, in which it is categorized as a general aviation facility.

== History ==
Named for the Kapalua Resort a few miles to the north, the airport replaced the Kaanapali Airport, which had an even shorter runway, in 1987 to allow valuable coastal land to be developed. The airport code name JHM stands for John Henry Magoon, who was president of Hawaiian Airlines when that airline developed the airport. Hawaiian operated de Havilland Canada DHC-7 Dash 7 turboprop aircraft on flights to Honolulu. The STOL capable, four engine, 50-passenger Dash 7 was the largest aircraft ever to operate scheduled passenger flights from the airport. Hawaiian discontinued service to Kapalua when the Dash 7 was retired from its fleet in 1994.

According to the Official Airline Guide (OAG), in late 1989 Hawaiian Airlines and Aloha Island Air were operating a combined total of up to 30 nonstop flights a day to Honolulu from Kapalua Airport, Hawaiian with Dash 7 aircraft and Aloha Island Air with de Havilland Canada DHC-6 Twin Otter turboprops with the latter air carrier operating its flights via a code sharing agreement with Aloha Airlines. In the spring of 1995, Aloha Island Air was the only airline operating nonstop service from Kapalua to Honolulu with 15 daily flights operated with DHC-6 Twin Otter aircraft via its code sharing agreement with Aloha Airlines. By the spring of 1999, Aloha Island Air continued to be only airline operating nonstop service from the airport to Honolulu with eight daily flights operated with de Havilland Canada DHC-8 Dash 8 turboprops via its code share with Aloha. Aloha Island Air subsequently changed its name to Island Air.

Mahalo Air, which operated between 1993 and 1997, also served Kapalua with flights to Honolulu using ATR 42 twin turboprop aircraft.

Island Air discontinued service to Kapalua on May 31, 2013, when it replaced its fleet of de Havilland Canada DHC-8 Dash 8s with ATR-72 propjets.

On November 2, 2016, Hawaiian Airlines announced they would resume service at Kapalua Airport beginning January 18, 2017 with flights to Honolulu and Kahului. Flights were to be operated by Hawaiian Air's ʻOhana by Hawaiian subsidiary utilizing 48-seat ATR 42-500 twin turboprop aircraft.

On November 15, 2016, Hawaiian Airlines announced that it was temporarily suspending sales of its Honolulu to West Maui service pending securing a TSA presence at Kapalua Airport.

On January 11, 2017, Hawaiian Airlines announced they expect to resume service at Kapalua West Maui Airport by late March.

On January 27, 2017, Hawaiian Airlines resumed selling tickets to and from Kapalua West Maui Airport, with service beginning March 1, 2017.

On March 25, 2020, Hawaiian Airlines suspended service to and from Kapalua West Maui Airport as part of its systemwide reduction in service due to the COVID-19 pandemic.

== Facilities and aircraft ==
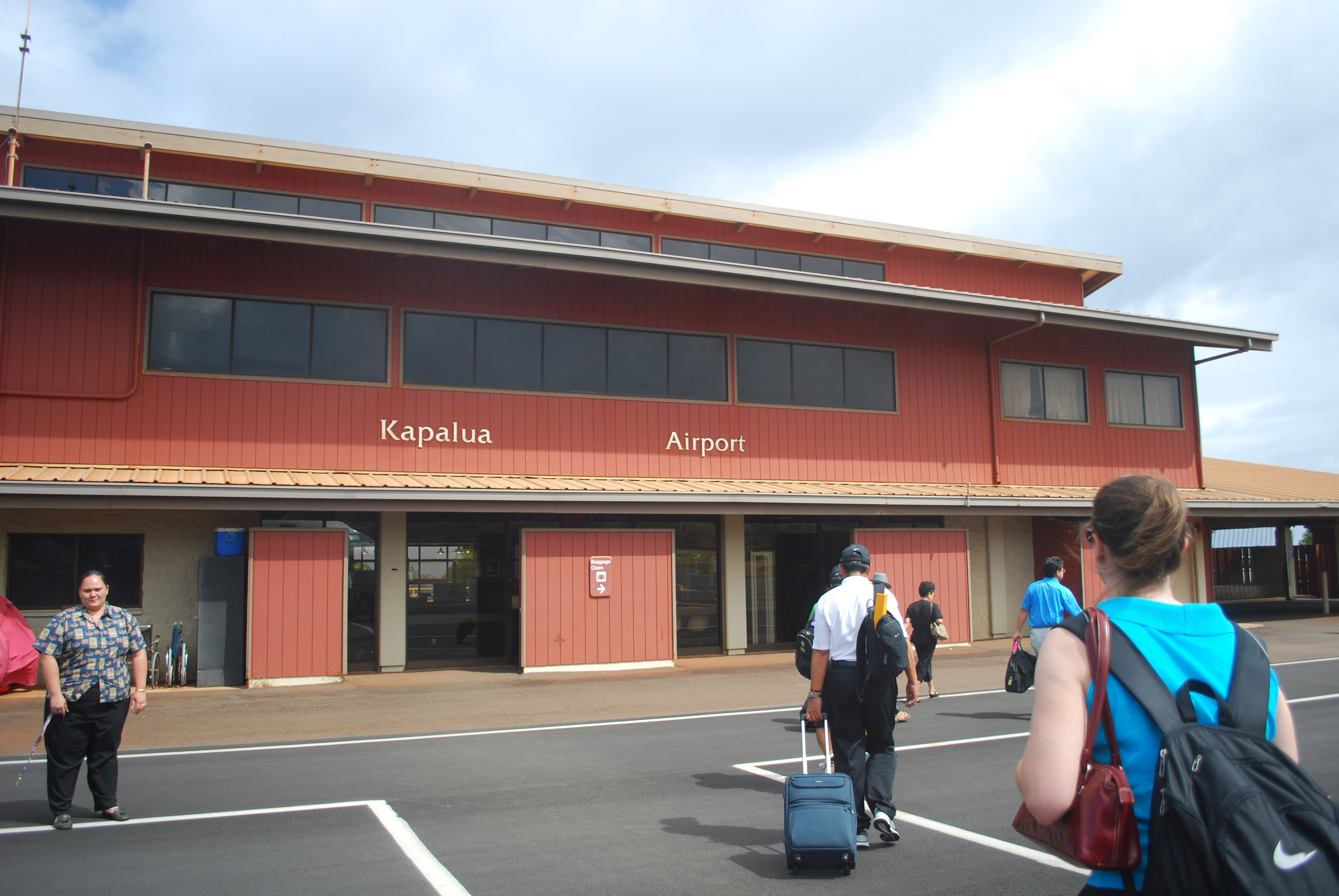
Airport terminal, 2009

Kapalua Airport is governed by a special agreement made by the state with Maui County. Previously a privately owned airport, major changes or improvements to Kapalua Airport cannot be made without the consent of the Maui County Council. The county insists on limiting development to preserve the Kapalua community from commercialization. Kapalua Airport is restricted to a single runway, and small terminal and support facilities. There are no air cargo facilities, which causes all arriving air cargo (FedEx Feeder) to unload directly on the ramp, and load directly into delivery trucks which line up outside the ramp gate. Operations are restricted to daytime hours only. Passengers departing on Mokulele Airlines are not screened by the Transportation Security Administration.

There is a snack bar offering a variety of light snacks, meals, and beverages.

The airport covers an area of 50 acres (20 ha) at an elevation of 256 feet (78 m) above mean sea level. It has one runway designated 2/20 with an asphalt surface measuring 3,000 by 100 feet (914 x 30 m). For the 12-month period ending December 31, 2004, the airport had 9,990 aircraft operations, an average of 27 per day: 51% scheduled commercial and 49% air taxi.

== Airlines and destinations ==
Mokulele Airlines offer a scheduled passenger service to Honolulu International Airport, Oahu.

Big Island Air and Royal Pacific Air provide unscheduled, on-demand charter flights and tours.

== Authority ==
Kapalua Airport is part of a centralized state structure governing all of the airports and seaports of Hawaii. The official authority of Kapalua Airport is the Governor of Hawaii who appoints the Director of the Hawaii Department of Transportation who has jurisdiction over the Hawaii Airports Administrator.

The Hawaii Airports Administrator oversees six governing bodies: Airports Operations Office, Airports Planning Office, Engineering Branch, Information Technology Office, Staff Services Office, Visitor Information Program Office. Collectively, the six bodies have authority over the four airport districts in Hawaii: Hawaiʻi Island District, Kauaʻi District, Maui District and the principal Oʻahu District. Kapalua Airport is a subordinate of the Maui District officials.

== See also ==
- List of airports in Hawaii
