= Sean K. L. Browne =

American artist

Spirit Way, silicon bronze sculpture by Sean K. L. Browne, 1987, Kapiʻolani Community College, Honolulu

Sean Kekamakupaʻa Lee Loy Browne (born 1953) was raised on Hawaiian Homestead Lands in Keaukaha, Hilo, Hawaii. A graduate of the Kamehameha Schools class of 1971, he earned his Bachelor’s degree at the University of Redlands in 1975 and his Master of Fine Arts in sculpture from the University of Hawaiʻi at Mānoa in 1983. In 1981 he traveled to Pietrasanta, Italy to study marble carving under Paoli Silverio and was later accepted as an artist-in-residence at Henreaux Marble Company in Querceta, Italy. In 1985 he was awarded a Fulbright Fellowship, enabling him to study stone sculpture under the guidance of Isamu Noguchi in Shikoku, Japan. For many years, Browne taught sculpture at the University of Hawaiʻi at Mānoa and at Kapiʻolani Community College.

Sean’s metal and stone commissions have been executed in Hawaii, California and abroad, including the Yamada Stone Company in Mure, Japan, the Girogio Angeli studio in Querceta, Italy and the Versiliese Foundry in Pietrasanta, Italy.

Some of Sean’s figurative commission work of Hawaiian royalty can be seen in Waikiki, Honolulu, including statues of King David Kalakaua, Princess Bernice Pauahi Bishop and Prince Jonah Kuhio Kalaniana’ole. Examples of Sean’s abstract stone and metal work, that draw inspiration from his native Hawaiian culture, can be seen at Kapiʻolani Community College, Pali Momi Medical Center, the Hawaii State Art Museum, the Daniel K. Inouye International Airport, Honolulu, Hawaii and the Ellison Onizuka Airport, Kona, Hawaii.

== Notable works ==
- Ikaika (strong) (1980), cast bronze and black granite sculpture, Hawaii State Art Museum
- Hui (1983), cast bronze, 1001 Bishop Square, Honolulu, Hawaii
- Ka Makau (1983), bronze sculpture, Keaukaha Elementary School, Hilo
- Ka Peʻahi IV (1983), sculpture, Hawaii State Art Museum
- Na Moku ʻEkolu (Three Islands) (1985), cast and welded silicon bronze sculpture, Maui Community College, Kahului
- Orpheus (1985), cast bronze, Honolulu Museum of Art
- Ring Pounder (1987), Westin Kaua’I Hotel, Lihue, Kaua’i
- Spirit Way (1987), bronze sculpture, Kapiʻolani Community College, Honolulu
- Ua Mau Ke Ea O Ka Aina I Ka Pono (1988), Carrara marble sculpture, Wailuku Judiciary Complex, Maui
- Aina Lani (1989), black granite tile and stainless steel sculpture, Pali Momi Medical Center, Pearl City
- Cape Form (1990), cast and welded bronze, Four Seasons Hotel, Wailea, Maui
- Mahaina II (1990), bronze sculpture, The Honolulu Advertiser, Honolulu
- Portrait of Maurice Sullivan (1990), cast bronze, St. Francis Medical Center, Honolulu, Hawaii
- King David Kalakaua (1989–91), bronze sculpture, Waikiki Gateway Park, Honolulu
- Fish Form (1991), granite, Grand Hyatt Wailea, Wailea, Maui
- Liberty (1991), black granite, Yamada Stone Museum, Aji, Kagawa, Japan
- Lahui (1992), silicon bronze sheet sculpture, Kakaako Waterfront Park
- Lima Hoʻola (1993) basalt sculpture, Hawaii State Hospital, Kaneohe
- Portrait of Sister Maureen Keleher O.S.F. (1994), cast bronze, St. Francis Medical Center, Honolulu, Hawaii
- Manta (1995), cast and welded bronze, Bank of Hawaii, Kapolei, Hawaii
- Pahoa (1995), basalt terrazzo sculpture, Pahoa High and Intermediate School, Pahoa
- Portrait of Mayor Tony Kunimura (1999), cast bronze, Lihue Civic Center, Kaua’i
- Mahiole (2000), red granite sculpture, Kona International Airport, Kona
- Prince Jonah Kuhio Kalaniana 'ole (2001), bronze sculpture, Kuhio Beach Park, Waikiki
- Ka Makahiki (2003), bronze and brass sculpture, Maʻemaʻe Elementary School, Oahu
- Ke Kaiʻi (The Guardian) by Sean K. L. Browne, granite 2003, Hawaii State Art Museum's Sculpture Garden
- Memorial Fountain (2005), limestone, Waianae Coast Comprehensive Center, Waianae, Hawaii
- Parian Warrior (2005), carved marble sculpture, Honolulu Museum of Art, Honolulu, Hawaii
- Princess Bernice Pauahi Bishop (2007), cast bronze , Helumoa, Waikiki, Hawaii
- Kahu O Ka Wai O Hilo (2009), black granite, Hilo Judiciary Complex, Hilo, Hawaii
- Masaru (Pundy) Yokouchi (2010), cast bronze, Maui Arts and Cultural Center, Kahului, Maui
- Pupukahi I Holomua Kakou (united we grow) (2013), cast/welded bronze sculpture, Kohala Elementary School, Kohala, Hawaii
- Ko’I (adze) (2023), black granite, Daniel K. Inouye International Airport, Honolulu, Hawaii
