= Ehime Maru and USS Greeneville collision =

2001 maritime accident

- The Japanese fishery high-school training ship Ehime Maru
- Date: 9 February 2001
- Place: Pacific Ocean, 9 nmi (17 km; 10 mi) off Oahu, Hawaii, U.S.
- Cause: Ship collision
- Result: Ehime Maru sunk, 9 people on Ehime Maru killed (3 crewmembers, 4 high-school students, 2 teachers); USS Greeneville damaged

Collision site marked on a map of Hawaii

On 9 February 2001, about nine nautical miles (17 km; 10 mi) south of Oahu, Hawaii, in the Pacific Ocean, the United States Navy (USN) Los Angeles-class submarine USS Greeneville collided with the Japanese fishery high-school training ship Ehime Maru (えひめ丸) from Ehime Prefecture. In a demonstration for some VIP civilian visitors, Greeneville performed an emergency ballast blow surfacing maneuver. As the submarine shot to the surface, she struck Ehime Maru. Within ten minutes of the collision, Ehime Maru sank. Nine of the thirty-five people aboard were killed: four high school students, two teachers, and three crew members.

Many Japanese people, including government officials, were concerned by news that civilians were present in Greeneville's control room at the time of the accident. Some expressed anger because of a perception that the submarine did not try to assist Ehime Maru's survivors and that the submarine's captain, Commander Scott Waddle, did not apologize immediately afterwards. The USN conducted a public court of inquiry, blamed Waddle and other members of Greeneville's crew, and dealt non-judicial punishment or administrative disciplinary action to the captain and some crew members. After Waddle had been questioned by the Naval Board of Inquiry, it was decided that a full court-martial would be unnecessary, and he was forced to retire and given an honorable discharge.

In response to requests from the families of Ehime Maru's victims and the government of Japan, the USN raised Ehime Maru from the ocean floor during October 2001 and moved it to shallow water closer to Oahu. Once there, USN and Japanese divers located and retrieved the remains of eight of the nine victims from the wreck. Ehime Maru was then moved back out to sea and scuttled in deep water. The USN compensated the government of Ehime Prefecture, Ehime Maru's survivors, and victims' family members for the accident. Waddle traveled to Japan in December 2002 to apologize to the ship's survivors and victims' families.

The accident renewed calls by many in Japan for the United States to make more effort to reduce crimes and accidents involving U.S. military personnel who injure or kill Japanese citizens. In response to the accident, the USN changed its policies regarding civilian visits to its ships.

== Incident ==
=== Prelude ===
On 10 January 2001, Ehime Maru, a Japanese fishing trawler owned by the government of Ehime Prefecture, 191 feet (58 m) in length and measuring 741 gross tons, departed from Uwajima Fisheries High School, a high school in Uwajima, Ehime Prefecture. The ship, captained by Hisao Ōnishi, headed for Hawaii on a planned 74-day voyage to train high school students who were interested in pursuing careers as fishermen. A total of 35 people were on board Ehime Maru: 20 crewmembers, 13 students, and two teachers. The ship's curriculum included long-line tuna fishing, maritime navigation, marine engineering, and oceanography. The ship docked at Honolulu Harbor on 8 February.

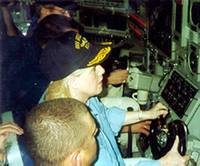
Tipper Gore at the helm of USS Greeneville during a similar Distinguished Visitor Embarkation mission, in 1999

On 9 February, USS Greeneville, a U.S. Navy nuclear-powered attack submarine, prepared to depart Pearl Harbor, Hawaii, to perform a public relations mission as part of the USN's Distinguished Visitor Embarkation (DVE) program. The program took civilians, members of Congress, journalists, and other "opinion makers" for rides on nuclear submarines to demonstrate the submarines' capabilities; its goal was to demonstrate the need to maintain a fleet of nuclear-powered submarines. Greeneville had previously participated in several DVE missions, carrying notable civilians such as Tipper Gore and James Cameron. For this mission, Greeneville was to carry 16 civilian Distinguished Visitors (DVs): eight corporate chief executive officers (CEOs), six of them with their spouses; and a free-lance sports writer with his spouse. The CEOs were in Hawaii to assist a fundraising effort to restore the retired battleship Missouri. This DVE visit had originally been arranged by retired Rear Admiral Richard C. Macke who was a former commander of the Pacific region before his early retirement in 1996 and who had volunteered for the Missouri Memorial Association. Accompanying the DV civilians on the mission was Navy Captain Robert L. Brandhuber, Chief of Staff for Rear Admiral Albert H. Konetzni Jr., the commander of the submarine component of the United States Pacific Fleet, abbreviated as COMSUBPAC. The captain of the Greeneville, Commander Scott Waddle, had commanded the submarine during several previous DVE missions.

Before departing for the mission, Commander Waddle was informed that the ship's Analog Video Signal Display Unit (AVSDU) was inoperative. The AVSDU was an analog video monitor, located forward of the submarine's periscope in the control room, that displayed information from the submarine's three sonar stacks and screens. The monitor helped communicate sonar information to the officer of the deck. Waddle decided to continue with the mission without attempting to repair the monitor, believing that it was not a crucial piece of equipment.

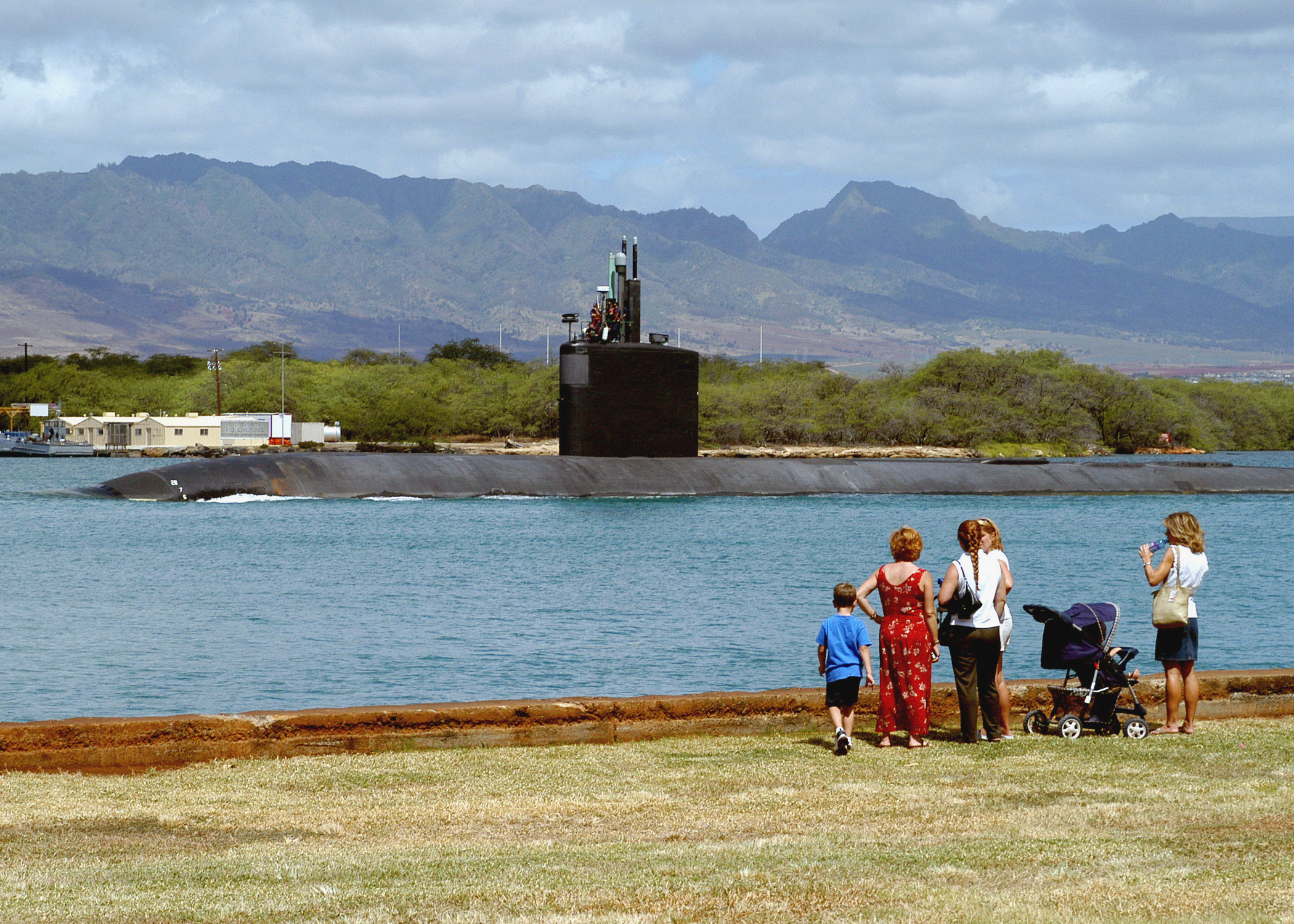
Greeneville transits the channel between Pearl Harbor and the Pacific Ocean.

Greeneville departed Pearl Harbor on time at 08:00 local time (HST) with a crew of 106 in addition to the 16 DV passengers and Chief of Staff Brandhuber. As the submarine transited the ship channel from Pearl Harbor, Waddle noticed that the weather was "hazier than normal", but he thought that the haze would burn off soon. Greeneville reached its dive point south of Oahu (21°6′N 157°55′W) slightly later than scheduled, at 10:17, and submerged. The DVs were scheduled to be served lunch in two sittings, the first from 10:30 to 11:30 and the second from 11:30 to 12:30. After lunch, the submarine was to display its operational abilities and then return the DVs to Pearl Harbor for a reception that was scheduled to begin at 14:30. The lunch service ran late, and other Greeneville officers repeatedly reminded Waddle that the submarine needed to begin its demonstration maneuvers or it would be late back to port. Finally, at 13:10, Waddle entered the submarine's control room and prepared to execute the demonstration. Fifteen of the 16 DVs and Brandhuber entered the control room to observe the maneuvers.

Meanwhile, at 12:00, Ehime Maru had departed Honolulu harbor en route to fishing grounds about 300 nautical miles (560 km) south (14°N 156°W) of Oahu. By 12:50, the ship was proceeding at 11 knots (13 mph; 20 km/h) about eight nautical miles (15 km) south of Oahu and was nearing the area where Greeneville was conducting the DVE cruise.

Three crewmen were on duty in Greeneville's sonar room. At 12:30, the submarine's sonar operators detected a surface vessel in the vicinity and designated the contact as "Sierra 12" (S-12). A few minutes later, they detected a second vessel estimated to be about 20 nautical miles (37 km) away, which was designated as "Sierra 13" (S-13). S-13 was Ehime Maru. Also tracking the sonar contacts in the control room was Patrick Seacrest, Greeneville's sole fire control technician on duty at the time. Seacrest was responsible for "determining the course, speed, and range of surface and submerged vessels (or targets) potentially posing a threat to the submarine." At 12:58, Seacrest designated the track of S-13 as heading away from Greeneville's location. Beginning at 13:00, Seacrest elected to discontinue updating the Contact Evaluation Plot (CEP) in the control room. The CEP is a "labor-intensive" paper display that plots ship data and contact information for reference by control room personnel. Seacrest stated that one of the reasons that he decided to stop updating the CEP was that the DV guests were standing between his watchstation and the CEP.

=== Collision ===
Before beginning the maneuvers, Waddle checked the submarine's sonar contacts and noted that there were several surface vessels in the vicinity, but none closer than seven nautical miles (13 km) away. Ehime Maru was one of these vessels. The civilians were spread throughout the control room, with three on the periscope platform and others in front of the fire control station, restricting free access to some of the displays. According to several crewmembers, Waddle, when informed that equipment preparations would further delay the start of the demonstration maneuvers, "seemed frustrated that he couldn't start the maneuvers right away".

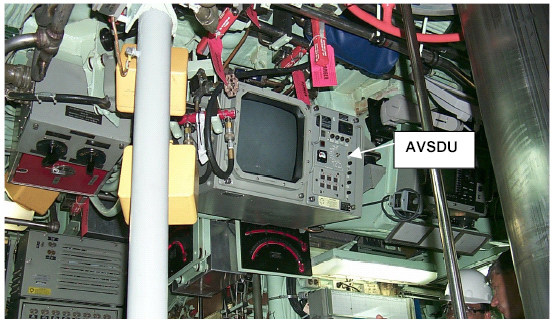
Greeneville's AVSDU (center) and periscope (partly visible, right side)

For 15 minutes, beginning at 13:15, 46 minutes after the scheduled time, Greeneville performed a series of drastic maneuvers, including high-speed, full-rudder, 35-degree turns side to side, as well as rapid up-and-down movements. Waddle personally directed the maneuvers. According to Waddle, the DVs "were loving it". Waddle adds, "I could barely suppress a smile as I watched the expressions of joy and amazement on the faces of our distinguished visitors". During the maneuvers, several civilians in the sonar room conversed with the sonar technicians, who were at the same time trying to keep track of any sonar contacts in the vicinity.

As the high-speed maneuvers finished at 13:30, Waddle called for Greeneville to perform an emergency dive (called an "emergency deep") followed by an emergency main ballast blow, a maneuver that brings the submarine from a depth of about 400 feet (120 m) to the surface in a few seconds by using high-pressure air to force the water out of the ship's ballast tanks as quickly as possible. The rise is so rapid that the submarine's bow rises high out of the water upon surfacing. Before executing this maneuver, the submarine was required to go to periscope depth to check for ships or dangerous obstacles on the surface. After completing the high-speed maneuvers, standing orders required the submarine to hold a steady course for three minutes to reestablish sonar contact, which had been disrupted by the high speed maneuvers, with any vessels in the area. In this case, however, Waddle ordered the submarine to change course and go to periscope depth after holding the steady course for only 90 seconds.

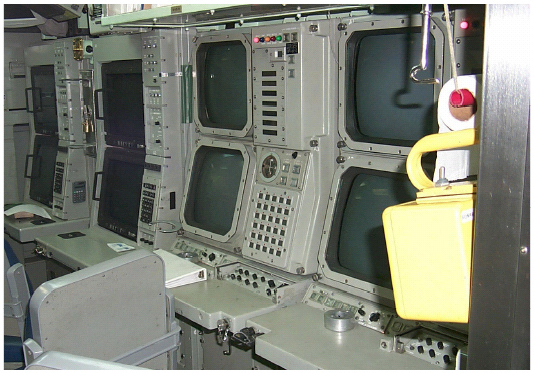
Greeneville's sonar room

As Greeneville ascended to periscope depth, Waddle checked the sonar displays and the fire control station monitors, but reported later that he heard and saw nothing to suggest that the previously detected vessels in the area were now any closer to the submarine's position than had been reported before the submarine began the high speed maneuvers. Because the AVSDU was not working, Greeneville's executive officer, Lieutenant Commander Gerald K. Pfeifer, entered the sonar room and observed the contacts on the sonar screens. Pfeifer then stood in the doorway between the sonar and control rooms, but did not communicate any updated sonar information to Waddle in the control room. At 13:34, sonar gained a new contact, designated S-14. Because Greeneville had not maintained a steady, slow course for a sufficient amount of time, the sonar data available to the Fire Control Technician of the Watch FT1 (SS) Patrick Seacrest did not allow accurate determination on Ehime Maru's range or course. Also, due to time constraints ordered by Waddle, the ship did not perform normal maneuvers which would be used to obtain accurate course and range information on the sonar contacts prior to proceeding to periscope depth.

At 13:38, Greeneville reached periscope depth (about 60 feet (18 m) below the surface). At this time, Ehime Maru was about 2,315 yards (2.117 km) or 1.14 nautical miles (2.1 km) away from the submarine and heading in her direction. Although sonar data began to more accurately depict Ehime Maru's true range and bearing at this point, this was not evident to the sonar operators. Lieutenant, Junior Grade Michael J. Coen, the officer of the deck, conducted an initial low magnification periscope search of the area and sighted no ships nearby.

Waddle then took the periscope before Coen could complete the normal high magnification search. Since waves were washing over the periscope, Waddle ordered the submarine to go up another few feet to increase the distance the periscope could view. Waddle then looked through the periscope at the area where he believed the reported surface contacts to be (possibly in error). Although Ehime Maru was at this point heading toward Greeneville's location, Waddle failed to see the ship. Regulations mandated that Waddle conduct a three-minute, 360-degree periscope scan before executing the emergency main ballast blow maneuver. Waddle, however, aware that they were still behind schedule, conducted a short scan, searching primarily in the sector where he believed the known contacts were located, noted that the haze was still present, and saw no ships in the vicinity. At the end of his scan, Waddle announced to the control room crew, "I hold no visual contacts." Waddle later explained how he conducted his periscope search:

I swept the scope in low power, went to high power, looked, then panned to the right, saw the island [Oahu] ... I can only see the mountain peak, I can't see the mountains ... because of this white haze ... Then I could see an airplane taking off. ... I panned to the right where I thought I would see [S-13] the Ehime Maru. I looked over at the remote repeater [own-ship's data] and I saw the numbers and [thought] that looks right. That's where the guy is. Didn't see him. Then went to low power and then turned to the right. I think ... the Ehime Maru was perhaps further to the right, and as I swept in low power ... missed her. And that's the only explanation that I can think of as to why I missed the vessel.

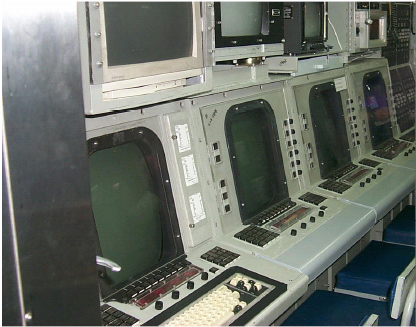
Greeneville's fire control console

Meanwhile, Seacrest was monitoring the ship's fire control console, which graphically displayed the relative position, bearing, and speed of any sonar contacts in the area. Seacrest had been monitoring three contacts on his screens, S-12, S-13 (Ehime Maru), and S-14. Absorbed in trying to get a clearer picture on S-14's location, Seacrest failed to report the bearing and range of S-13 (Ehime Maru) to Waddle during Waddle's periscope search, which Seacrest's monitors now showed was about 3,000 yards (2.7 km) away and closing. During Waddle's periscope search, Seacrest was busy operating other control room instruments and did not actively monitor his fire control displays. After the periscope search was over, and hearing Waddle's report of no visual contacts, Seacrest decided that his information for S-13 was incorrect and manually respotted the S-13 contact on his screen to a distance of 9,000 yards (8.2 km) away.

After completing the emergency dive at about 13:40, Waddle invited two of the civilian guests, John Hall, CEO of a Texas oil company, and Jack Clary, a freelance sports writer from Massachusetts, to operate the controls for the emergency main ballast blow. Clary sat in the helmsman's chair and Hall stood at the high-pressure air valve levers, supervised closely by Greeneville crewmen. After the two civilians had taken their positions, at 13:42:25 Waddle ordered the maneuver executed, and they threw the control levers as instructed. The submarine began its rapid ascent toward the surface.

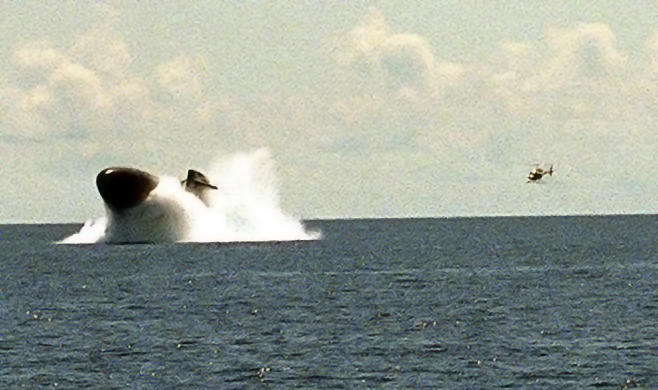
USS Pittsburgh demonstrates an emergency main ballast blow

At 13:43:15, the rapidly ascending Greeneville surfaced directly under Ehime Maru (21°05.5′N 157°49.1′W), and the submarine's rudder sliced Ehime Maru's hull from starboard to port. The people aboard Ehime Maru heard two loud noises and felt the ship shudder from two severe impacts. Ehime Maru's bridge crew looked aft and saw the submarine breach the water's surface next to their ship. Within five seconds Ehime Maru lost power and began to sink. As Waddle watched through Greeneville's periscope, Ehime Maru stood almost vertically on its stern and sank in about five minutes as the people on the fishing ship scrambled to abandon ship.

=== Emergency response ===
At 13:48, Greeneville radioed a distress call to COMSUBPAC at Pearl Harbor for assistance. COMSUBPAC notified the local United States Coast Guard (USCG) unit at 13:55 which began a search-and-rescue effort. The submarine maneuvered towards Ehime Maru's survivors to attempt a rescue. Weather conditions were inhibitive: 15- to 20-knot winds, which, in turn, were producing waves of 8 to 12 feet (2.4 to 3.7 m). Due to these rough seas, the submarine's main deck hatches could not be opened; the only outside access was through the top of the sail through its access trunk. Greeneville, moreover, was still low in the water because it normally took 30 minutes to pump out the remaining water in the ballast tanks after an emergency blow. As the heavy, partially submerged submarine bobbed in the ocean, it also displaced large waves that, in Waddle's opinion, threatened to capsize the life rafts in which Ehime Maru's survivors were gathering. Waddle decided that it would be safer to stand off the submarine from the group of survivors and wait for assistance to arrive. Ehime Maru's survivors, many of them struggling in the diesel fuel released from their sinking ship, were able to gather on the several life rafts that had deployed automatically as their ship sank.

A USCG helicopter arrived at 14:27, noted the survivors in the life rafts, and began searching for any survivors who might still be in the water. At 14:31 and 14:44 respectively, a USCG rigid-hulled inflatable boat and patrol boat arrived and administered first aid to the survivors in the rafts. Media helicopters also arrived during the rescue operation, and the incident was reported quickly by major news organizations. Of the 35 people aboard Ehime Maru (20 crew members, 13 students, and 2 teachers), the USCG rescued 26 people and took them to Oahu for medical treatment. Only one of the survivors had a serious injury, a broken clavicle; he was hospitalized for five days. Nine other people were missing, including four 17-year-old high school students and the two teachers. None of the nine missing were seen by any of the survivors, Greeneville crewmembers, or USCG personnel after the ship sank. Captain Ōnishi stated that the nine missing people were probably in the ship's galley and engine rooms when the ship sank. USCG and USN aircraft and ships searched the ocean around Ehime Maru's last location continuously for 22 days, until 2 March. Two Japanese civilian vessels also joined the search. No remains of the nine missing people were discovered during the search.

== Immediate aftermath ==
Soon after the incident occurred, Japanese Premier Yoshirō Mori was informed of the accident as he was playing golf in Japan. Acknowledging the message, Mori resumed his round of golf, ending it an hour and a half after the first message, an action for which he was later much criticized, owing in part to the use of stock photographs taken the previous summer showing Mori enjoying his round of golf.

Since the collision involved a commercial vessel, the U.S. National Transportation Safety Board (NTSB) had jurisdiction to conduct the investigation into the accident. An NTSB official, along with several USN and USCG officers, questioned Waddle and Pfeifer about the incident as soon as Greeneville moored at Pearl Harbor. That same day, Admiral Konetzni removed Waddle as captain of Greeneville and reassigned him to his staff pending the outcome of the accident investigation.

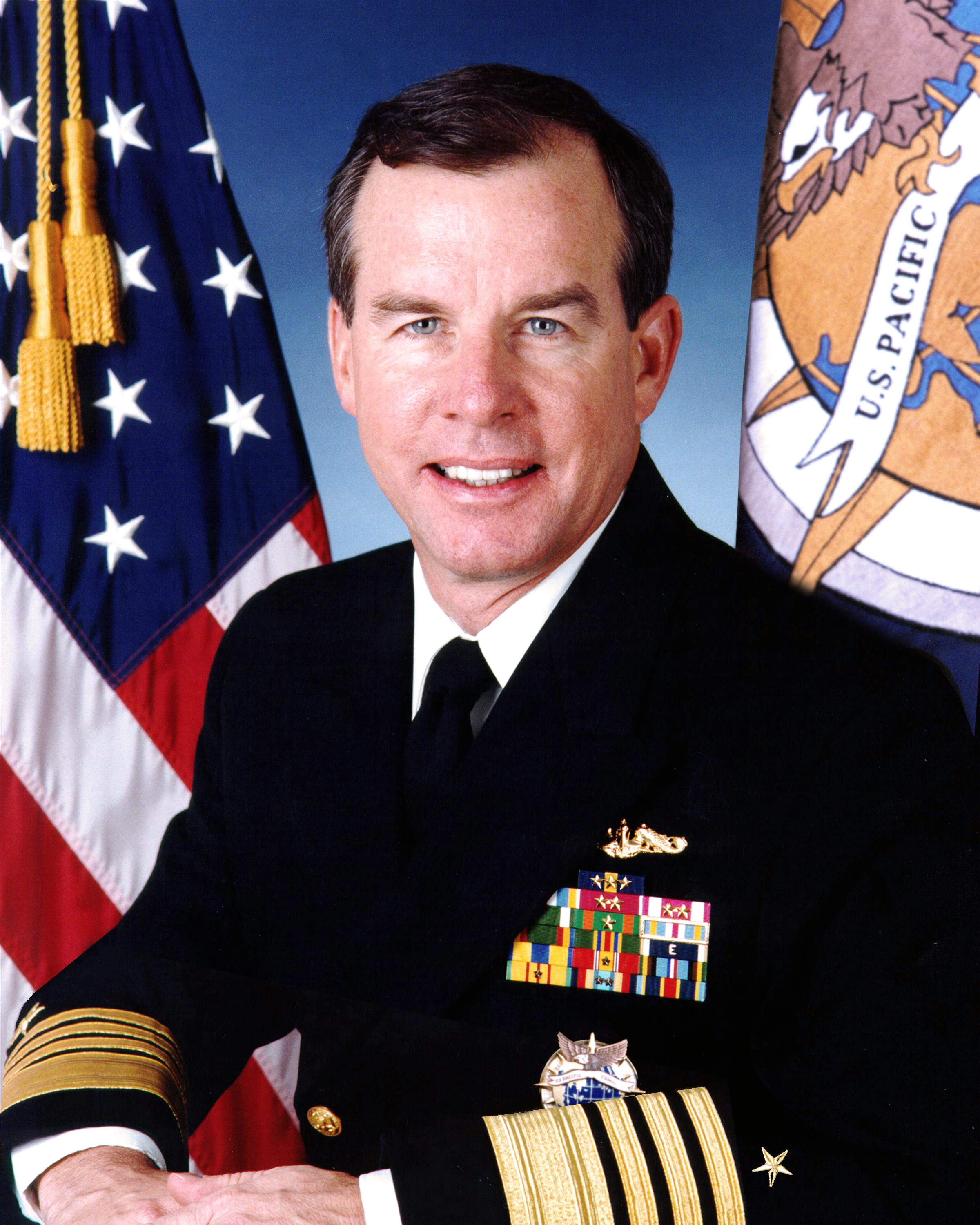
U.S. Admiral Thomas Fargo, commander of the U.S. Pacific Fleet at the time of the incident

Two days after the sinking, on 11 February, U.S. President George W. Bush apologized for the accident on national television, stating, "I want to reiterate what I said to the prime minister of Japan: I'm deeply sorry about the accident that took place; our nation is sorry." Secretary of State Colin Powell and Secretary of Defense Donald Rumsfeld also publicly apologized. The U.S. ambassador to Japan, Tom Foley, personally apologized to both Premier Mori and to the Emperor of Japan. The public apologies to the Japanese from the highest American officials caused resentment among some American veterans of the Pacific War and their families, as well as among Asian victims of Imperial Japanese aggression and occupation. Richard Cohen wrote a column in The Washington Post, saying "We've Apologized Enough to Japan", denounced the "hypocrisy" of Japan's recent gestures of compensation and remorse to some of Japan's World War II victims, which he said were offered "grudgingly", while noting that the U.S. had apologized profusely for the accidental collision.

On 11 February, during an "extremely emotional exchange", the commander of the U.S. Pacific Fleet, Admiral Thomas B. Fargo, personally apologized to families of the Ehime Maru's victims, who had arrived in Hawaii the day before. Several of the family members asked that Ehime Maru be raised from the ocean floor. Waddle had asked to accompany Fargo to apologize to the victims' families as well, but the COMSUBPAC public affairs office told him that he could not. The next day, the family members were taken by boat to view the accident site.

The perceived lack of remorse by Waddle, and reports in the Japanese media that Greeneville had made no effort to assist Ehime Maru's survivors as they waited for almost one hour for rescue angered many Japanese citizens, especially the family members of the missing. One Japanese family member publicly referred to Waddle as, "the most terrible criminal of them all". Another family member, referring to Waddle said, "If you're a man, you should fall on your knees and ask for our pardon!" In response, Waddle delivered letters of apology to the Japanese consulate in Hawaii for delivery to the victims' families during the last week of February.

Japanese government officials publicly expressed concern about the reports that civilians had been at Greeneville's controls during the collision. Japan's foreign minister, Yōhei Kōno, complained that U.S. officials had not provided details of the civilians' involvement, stating, "I cannot help but say it is an extremely grave situation if it were the case that the participation of civilians in the submarine's surfacing maneuver led to the accident."

In February 2001, vice chief of naval operations Admiral William Fallon was given Presidential special envoy status and dispatched to Japan to apologize for the collision. Fallon, along with Ambassador Tom Foley, met with family members of the victims at the Ambassador's official residence in Tokyo and in the Ehime Maru's home port of Uwajima, Ehime Prefecture, bowing deeply and expressing regret on behalf of the United States and President George W. Bush. His deferential show of contrition to the families, performed in front of news cameras, was widely credited with ameliorating a situation that had the potential to damage US-Japan relations.

The collision was also mentioned in the JAG episode "Iron Coffin" which aired on CBS on February 20, 2001.

== Damage to Greeneville ==
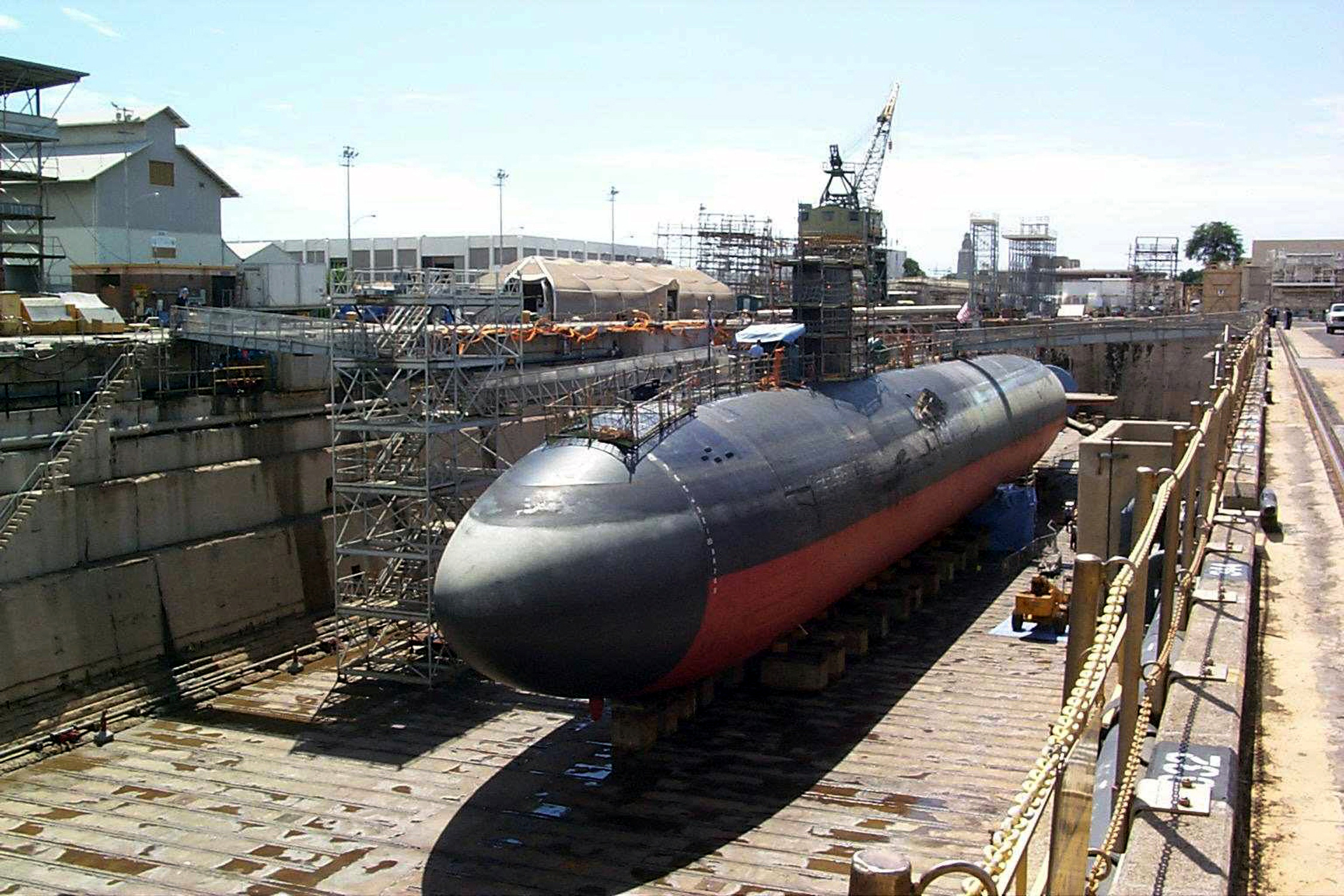
Greeneville in drydock at Pearl Harbor on 21 February 2001

Greeneville suffered some damage in the collision. Beginning at the 31-foot (9 m) mark on the submarine's rudder, surface tiles had been sheared off, exposing bare metal, and there were several dents on the rudder's leading edge, one of which had punctured the metal skin. A 24-foot (7 m) section of acoustic hull surface treatment tiles below the sail had also been sheared off.

Greeneville was repaired in a drydock at Pearl Harbor at a cost of US$2 million. After the repairs were completed on 18 April 2002, the submarine resumed operational status.

== Court of inquiry convenes ==
In addition to the NTSB investigation, the USN also initiated their own investigation on 10 February. USN Admiral Charles Griffiths was assigned to direct the investigation. Griffiths' team completed a preliminary inquiry report and submitted it to Admiral Fargo on 16 February. The next day, Fargo announced that the USN would convene a court of inquiry, the USN's highest form of administrative hearing.

A USN court of inquiry is similar to a grand jury investigation in civil court. The court has subpoena power and provides legal safeguards for the affected parties, such as the right to be represented by counsel. The court is a military investigative process and as such has no judge. Instead, three admirals comprise the court and make a report based on the evidence presented in the inquiry. Testimony and other evidence presented in the court can later be used in court-martial proceedings.

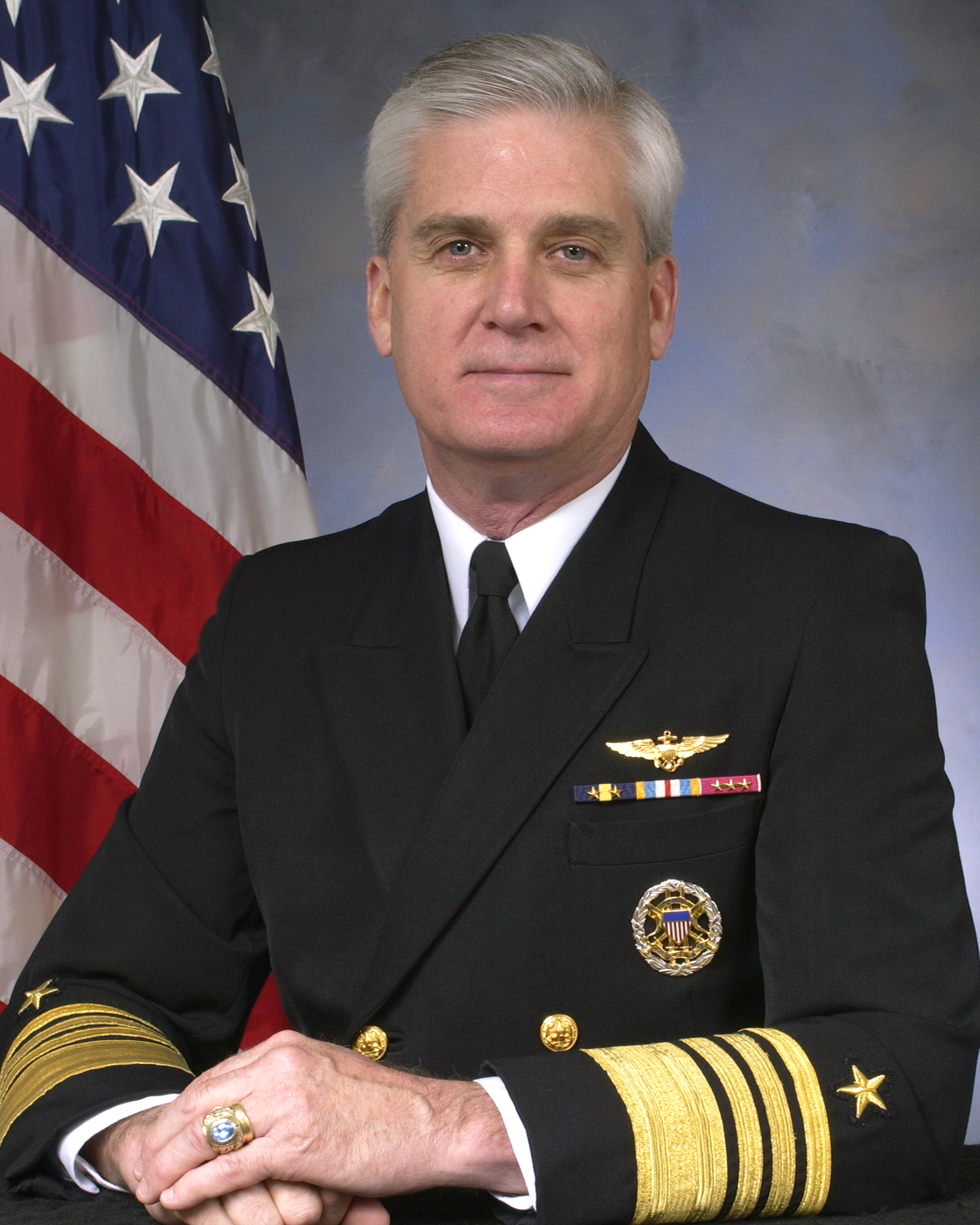
USN Admiral (then Vice Admiral) John B. Nathman, who chaired the court of inquiry into the Ehime Maru accident

The inquiry panel into the accident consisted of Vice Admiral John B. Nathman and Rear Admirals Paul F. Sullivan and David M. Stone. At Fargo's invitation the Japan Maritime Self-Defense Force (JMSDF) sent Rear Admiral Isamu Ozawa to participate in the inquiry as a non-voting adviser. The three named "affected" parties of the inquiry were Waddle, Pfeifer, and Coen, who were present in the hearing room throughout the inquiry. Commander Mark Patton, a classmate of Waddle at the U.S. Naval Academy in Annapolis, Maryland, twenty years ago, was quoted as saying "The general opinion on the waterfront was that it was important that he stand up and take responsibility. We wanted to see that happen. It was important for the public to see that happen. And he did that very well."

The court of inquiry began on 5 March 2001. Representing Waddle as counsel was Charles Gittins, who arrived in Hawaii on 4 March. Family members of the Ehime Maru victims were seated directly behind Waddle in the hearing room and throughout the inquiry frequently reacted very emotionally and vocally to evidence presented during the hearings.

The court called numerous witnesses, including Griffiths, Brandhuber, and Ōnishi. Ōnishi testified that large waves swept him overboard and far from his sinking ship, preventing him from assisting the rest of Ehime Maru's crew as they clung to the sinking ship. Afterwards, Waddle approached Ōnishi and apologized for the accident.

Waddle also apologized to several groups of Ehime Maru family members on 8 and 16 March. One of them, Naoko Nakata, wife of one of the missing crewmembers, asked Waddle to "please tell the truth in court". Soon thereafter, Waddle also apologized again during an interview with a Japanese television network.

Rear Admiral Albert H. Konetzni testified during the inquiry that Waddle and his crew had rushed into Greeneville's final maneuvers without taking enough time to ensure that no other vessels were in the vicinity. In a statement that was widely reported in the media, Konetzni looked at Waddle and said, "I'd like to go over there and punch him for not taking more time".

Seacrest was given testimonial immunity in exchange for his testimony. Pfeifer and Coen submitted unsworn statements to the court and, therefore, did not have to face cross-examination.

Waddle requested immunity in exchange for his offer to testify, but Fargo denied the request, stating that Waddle's testimony was not "essential" in determining the facts of the case. In spite of the denial of immunity, Waddle elected to testify for the court. Waddle stated later that he felt he needed to testify because he had promised some of the Ehime Maru family members that he would do so, he had heard that Greeneville's crew expected him to, and he wanted to get his side of the story into the record.

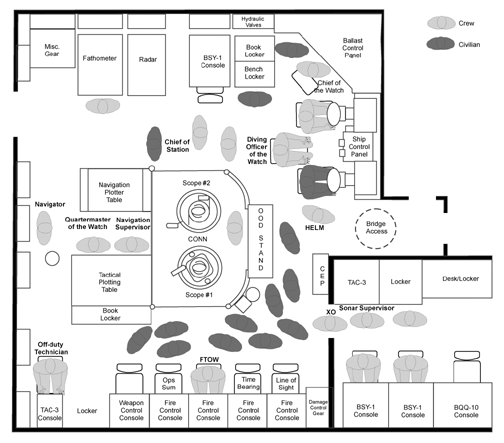
Diagram of Greeneville's control room shows the locations of the 32 people in the room at the time of the emergency ballast blow maneuver. The darker marks represent the locations of the DV civilians.

After hearing testimony from 31 witnesses, the court completed its hearings on 20 March. None of the civilian DVs were asked to testify. The inquiry report was submitted to Fargo on 20 April.

== Findings of the court ==
The court made several findings, including that Waddle failed to take positive action in response to the non-availability of the AVSDU, nine of the 13 watchstations in and around the control room were staffed by substitute personnel, and that one of the sonar operators was unqualified to stand watch. The court also issued numerous opinions, including that the accident was caused by "a series and combination of individual negligence(s) onboard Greeneville," "artificial urgency" by Waddle to rush the submarine through its demonstration schedule as it began to run late, failure to follow standard procedures, the abbreviated periscope search, distractions and obstruction caused by the presence of the civilian guests, crew training deficiencies, overconfidence and complacency, and Waddle's not paying enough attention to ship contact information. The court found that, although Brandhuber was the senior officer present on Greeneville, Waddle as captain was solely responsible for the safe navigation of the submarine. The inquiry report went into great detail on the purpose and rules surrounding the USN's DVE program.

The court recommended against court-martial for the officers involved because of an absence of any "criminal intent or deliberate misconduct." Instead, the court recommended non-judicial punishment for Waddle and Seacrest and administrative action for Brandhuber, Pfeifer, Coen, Greeneville's chief of the boat MMCM/SS Douglas Coffman, and sonar supervisor STS1/SS Edward McGiboney. The court recommended that the USN DVE program continue.

Relatives of Ehime Maru's crewmembers were angry that none of the USN personnel involved would be court-martialed and that Waddle could remain in the USN and would retain his retirement pension. Ryosuke Terata, father of one of the missing students, said with regard to Waddle, "If (he were) in Japan, he would be fired and indicted on charges such as professional negligence resulting in death."

On 23 April, Waddle received an admiral's mast (a form of USN non-judicial punishment) from Fargo at the USN Pacific Fleet headquarters in Pearl Harbor. Fargo pronounced Waddle guilty of dereliction of duty and improper hazarding of a vessel. He fined Waddle a half-month's pay for two months (fine delayed for six months, and waived after the six months with good behavior), gave him a verbal reprimand, and "made clear that [Waddle's] resignation was expected". Coen also received an admiral's mast in which he was "counseled for failing to execute his duties to ensure the safe navigation of the ship and to properly supervise watch personnel in the control room". Seacrest was admonished at a captain's mast, and Brandhuber, Pfeifer, Coffman, and McGiboney received formal administrative admonishments. The masts and administrative admonishments were documented and placed in the servicemembers' military records, perhaps affecting their future chances for promotions and assignments. Waddle, who had been working at a Navy desk job since being relieved of command, formally retired from the USN on 1 October 2001. Waddle did receive interviews from several private corporations who "put more value in the way Waddle handled himself during the grueling, 12-day court of inquiry than they did in any sort of blame for the collision." After 10 months of unemployment, Waddle worked as a project manager for an energy company in North Carolina and, in July 2004, started his own business as a consultant, executive coach, and public speaker.

== Salvage and recovery ==
On 16 February 2001, the USN Supervisor of Salvage and Diving (SUPSALV) and Submarine Development Squadron 5 (SUBDEVRON 5), using the Scorpio remotely piloted underwater vehicle (ROV), located Ehime Maru in 2,000 feet (610 m) of water on the ocean bottom (21°04.95′N 157°49.58′W). During the next two weeks, the USN used the Scorpio and the Deep Drone ROVs to search the ocean bottom around Ehime Maru for the remains of any of its missing crewmembers, without success.

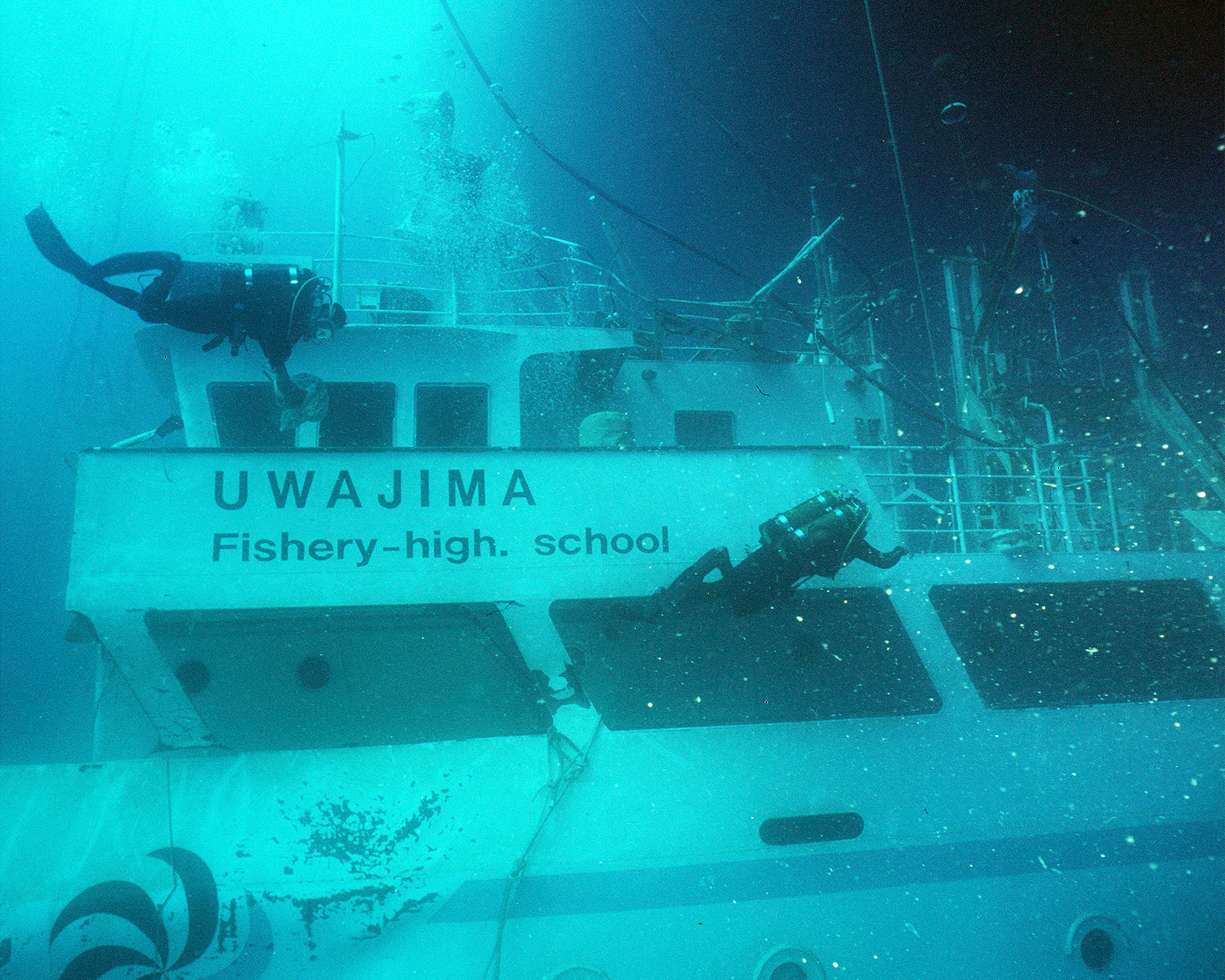
Divers inspect the wreckage of Ehime Maru off Oahu, 5 November 2001

After assessing the technical feasibility and environmental effect of raising Ehime Maru from the ocean bottom, the U.S. government, in June 2001, decided to proceed with recovering the ship from the ocean floor. The USN contracted the Dutch company Smit International and Crowley Maritime Corp., headquartered in Washington state, to salvage the wreck of Ehime Maru. After consultation between the contractors, representatives from the Japanese government, and U.S. government officials, the decision was made not to raise Ehime Maru all the way to the surface but to lift and carry it underwater to shallow water near Oahu. Once there, divers could enter the ship. The operation would be the first to lift something of that size from such a depth. USN Rear Admiral William Klemm directed the recovery operation.

Using the Phoenix III ROV, contractors, beginning on 20 July 2001, first removed Ehime Maru's mast and other items on the ship's decks that could interfere with the lifting operation. Assisted by technical experts from Japan, including one from the company that built Ehime Maru, the Rockwater II contract diving support vessel prepared the ship for lifting beginning the first week of August. After some difficulty, Ehime Maru was lifted off the ocean floor by Rockwater II on 5 October and moved slowly to a location closer to shore. On 14 October the wreck was set down in 115 ft (35 m) of water one statute mile (1.6 km) south of Honolulu International Airport's reef runway.

On 15 October, the first team of USN divers from Mobile Diving and Salvage Unit ONE (MDSU-1) began assessing the sunken vessel. Working in low- to zero-visibility conditions, 66 MDSU-1 and 30 Japanese JMSDF divers from the submarine rescue ship JDS Chihaya conducted 526 dives over 29 days, searching the wreck. Ōnishi, relatives of some of the missing crewmembers, and several Japanese government officials observed the operation from the dive support ships. The divers recovered the bodies of eight of the nine missing people (three crewmembers, four students, and the two teachers), many personal effects, and several items unique to the ship, such as its nameplate, bell, anchors, and helm.

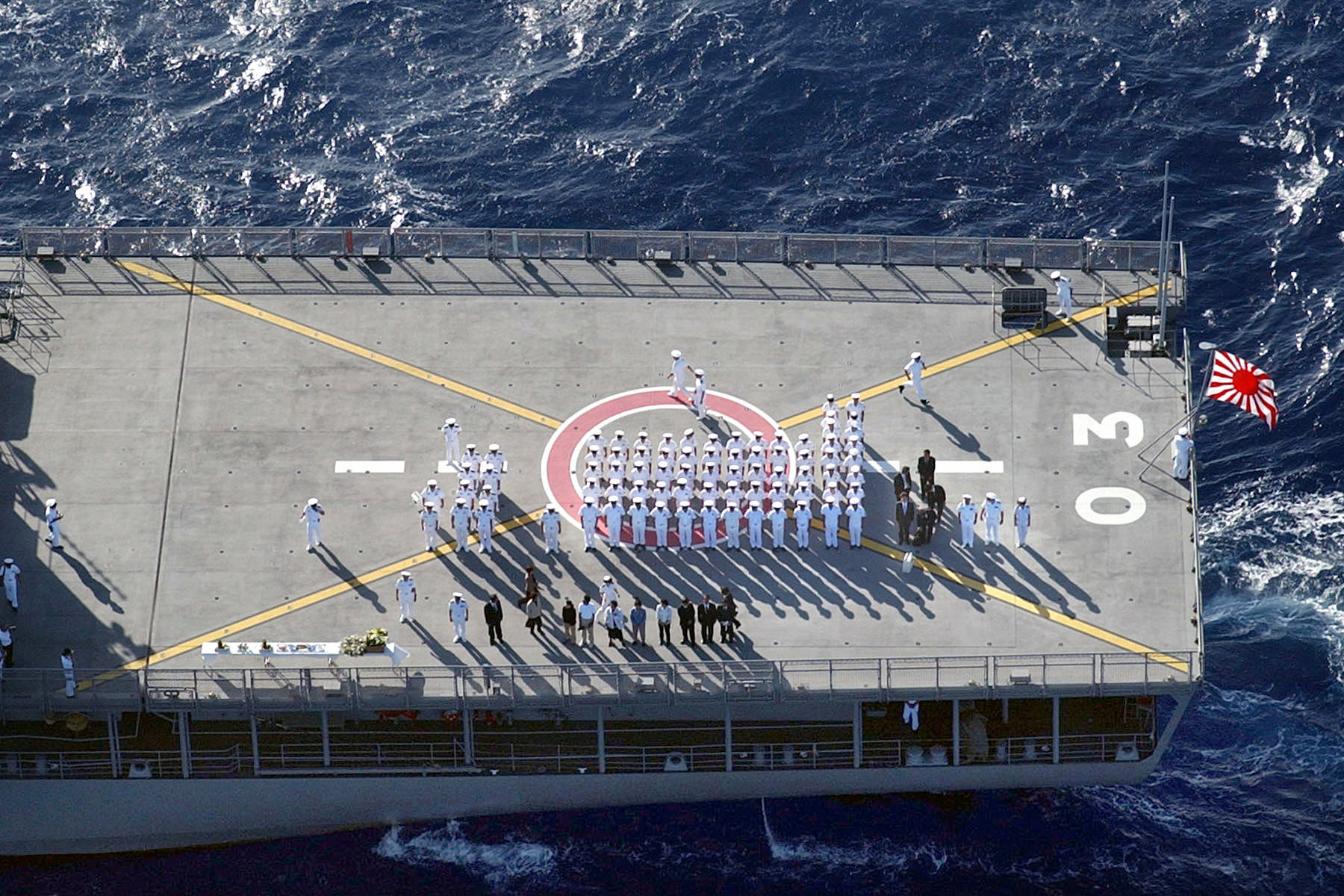
Relatives of Ehime Maru crewmembers participate in a final ceremony for the ship aboard JS Chihaya on 25 November 2001

After the recovery was complete, on 25 November, Ehime Maru was lifted, towed back out to sea suspended about 90 feet (27 m) below the towing barge, and scuttled in 6,000 feet (1,800 m) of water 12 nautical miles (22 km) south of Barbers Point. The event was witnessed by three of Ehime Maru's victims' families on board Chihaya. The total cost of the salvage operations was about $60 million.

== Compensation ==
On 10 April 2002, the USN signed an agreement to pay the Ehime Prefectural Government US$11.47 million in compensation for the sinking of Ehime Maru. Some $8.87 million was to help pay to replace the ship, and the remainder was to pay for counseling and financial aid for the survivors as well as to pay for a memorial ceremony for the victims.

On 14 November 2002, the USN agreed to pay $13.9 million in compensation to 33 of the 35 families of victims or injured survivors. The remaining two families accepted a $2.6 million settlement from the USN on 31 January 2003. Before accepting the settlement, the two families had asked for face-to-face apologies from the USN and Waddle, a full investigation into the collision, a reasonable compensation offer, and a promise from the USN to help prevent similar accidents in the future. Masumi Terata, whose teenage son Yusuke died in the accident, said that she was happy that the settlement was behind them, but added that, "My true feeling is that if possible, I want to see my son one more time."

== Waddle's trip to Japan ==
On 14 December 2002, Waddle, accompanied by Charles Gittins, traveled to Japan to apologize personally to the victims' families. On 15 December, Waddle visited the Ehime Maru memorial at Uwajima Fisheries High School and placed a wreath of white lilies before a monument to the dead, bowed in silence and then read the victims' names aloud. No local officials were present during Waddle's visit, citing statements from some victims' families that they did not want Waddle to visit. Later that day, Waddle met with some of the families of the victims and with some of the survivors. The next day, in Tokyo, Waddle met with Masumi Terata. Speaking of her meeting with Waddle, Terata stated, "I am first and foremost the family member of a victim and Mr. Waddle is first and foremost a victimizer. But when I saw Mr. Waddle as a person who was crying and apologizing, I thought he was apologizing from the heart."

In a press conference on 17 December, Gittins criticized the USN for their continued insistence that Waddle not come to Japan to visit the victims' families. Said Gittins, "For the life of me, I cannot understand why the Navy did not want Scott to come meet with the families and do what is morally right and what is understood in Japanese culture to be the right thing to do". Gittins added that he had received emails from the USN as recently as the week before urging Waddle not to make the visit. Gittins stated that the reason that it took two years for Waddle to make the visit to Japan was because Waddle was forbidden to do so while he was still in the USN and because of financial constraints and fear of litigation after his retirement.

== Effect on Japanese–American relations ==
After the sinking of Ehime Maru, many Japanese people, including government officials, questioned why civilians were allowed in Greeneville's control room during maneuvers that could place other, uninvolved, vessels at risk. Also, the Japanese expressed concern that the United States Navy did not immediately take full responsibility for the accident, appeared at first to try to conceal information about the DVE program, and did not court martial Waddle or have him personally apologize immediately after the accident. The subsequent effort by the U.S. government to retrieve the victims' remains from the sunken wreck, numerous apologies from U.S. government representatives and Waddle, and the compensation paid to the Ehime government and to the victims' families appear to have assuaged much of the anger directed toward the U.S. government and military. Many Japanese, both government and private citizens, however, continue to demand the U.S. government to make more effort to reduce or eliminate serious accidents and crimes involving U.S. military personnel.

Although the United States and Japan have been strong allies since the end of World War II, the accident involving Ehime Maru showed that the relationship is not always completely harmonious, especially with regard to incidents in which U.S. military personnel or assets injure or kill Japanese citizens or damage their property. In response to crimes committed by U.S. servicemembers against Japanese citizens, such as the 1995 Okinawan rape incident, Japanese citizens and some Japanese government officials have questioned the equality of the Treaty of Mutual Cooperation and Security between the United States and Japan and the issue of responsibility and accountability by the U.S. government concerning the actions of its military members in Japan. In addition, the Japanese have questioned the U.S. commitment to safe operations of its military assets in light of several accidents, including aircraft crashes and other ship collisions that have injured or killed Japanese citizens.

== Later events ==
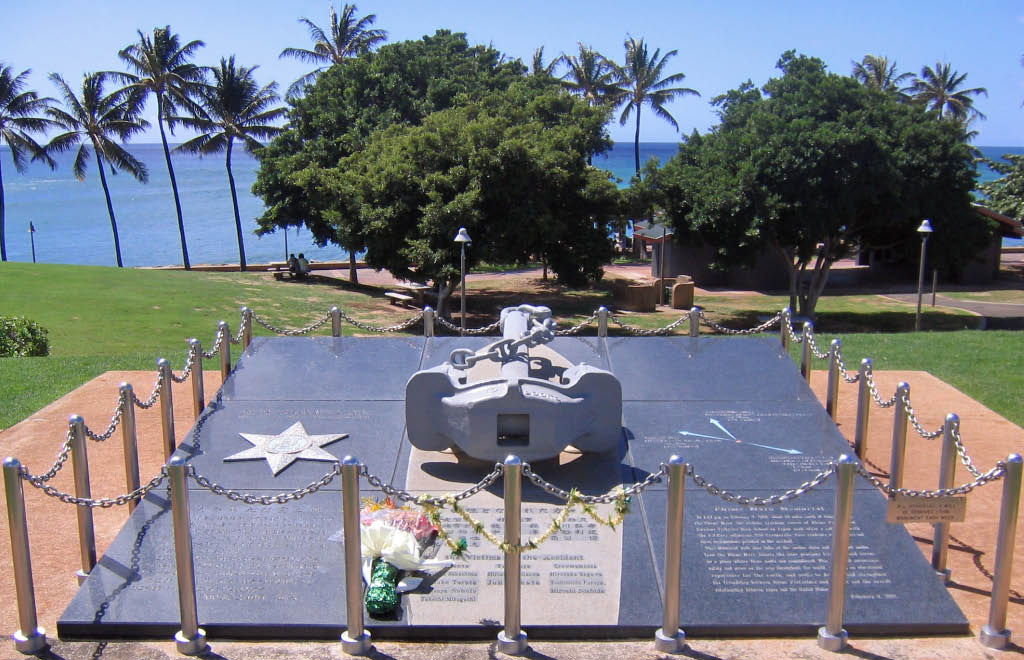
The Ehime Maru memorial located in Kakaako Waterfront Park near Honolulu, Hawaii

Acting on a request from the Japanese government, the State of Hawaii established a non-profit group, the Ehime Maru Memorial Association, on 11 November 2001, to coordinate the activities of placing an Ehime Maru memorial at a site in Hawaii. The monument to the ship was completed on 9 February 2002, at Kakaako Waterfront Park near Honolulu. Each year since the accident, memorial ceremonies have been held on 9 February at Uwajima Fisheries High School in Ehime and at the Ehime Maru monument in Hawaii.

Shipbuilders in Imabari, Ehime Prefecture, began construction on a new Ehime Maru on 17 April 2002. Upon completion, the new ship sailed to Hawaii, arriving on 17 June 2003. In a ceremony at the Ehime Maru monument, the principal of Uwajima Fishery at the time of the disaster, Kazumitsu Joko (上甲一光 Jōkō Kazumitsu), read a message from Moriyuki Kato, the governor of Ehime Prefecture, addressed to the Hawaiian people. The message stated, in part, "Since the Ehime Maru tragic accident two years ago, the people of Hawaii have shown compassion and warm support."

The NTSB released its report on the accident on 19 October 2005. The NTSB report largely confirmed the USN's inquiry findings, including that Waddle was primarily responsible for the collision. The NTSB report, however, was more critical of the distractions caused by the DV civilians on Greeneville that contributed to the accident. The report concluded that the USN had recognized the "detrimental operating conditions" aboard Greeneville and had taken "additional measures to address the safety of operations" on submarines, including additional restrictions on DVE visitors.

On the 20th anniversary of the incident in February 2021, former commander Scott Waddle published an open letter of apology.

== See also ==
- INS Vindhyagiri (F42)
- List of submarine incidents since 2000
- USS Hartford and USS New Orleans collision
- USS Fitzgerald and MV ACX Crystal collision, 2017
- Daigo Fukuryū Maru
- 1959 Okinawa F-100 crash
- 1964 Machida F-8 crash
- 1977 Yokohama F-4 crash
- FV Antares
