= Kakaʻako Waterfront Park =

Park in downtown Honolulu, Hawaii, U.S.

Coordinates: 21.293901°N 157.864092°W

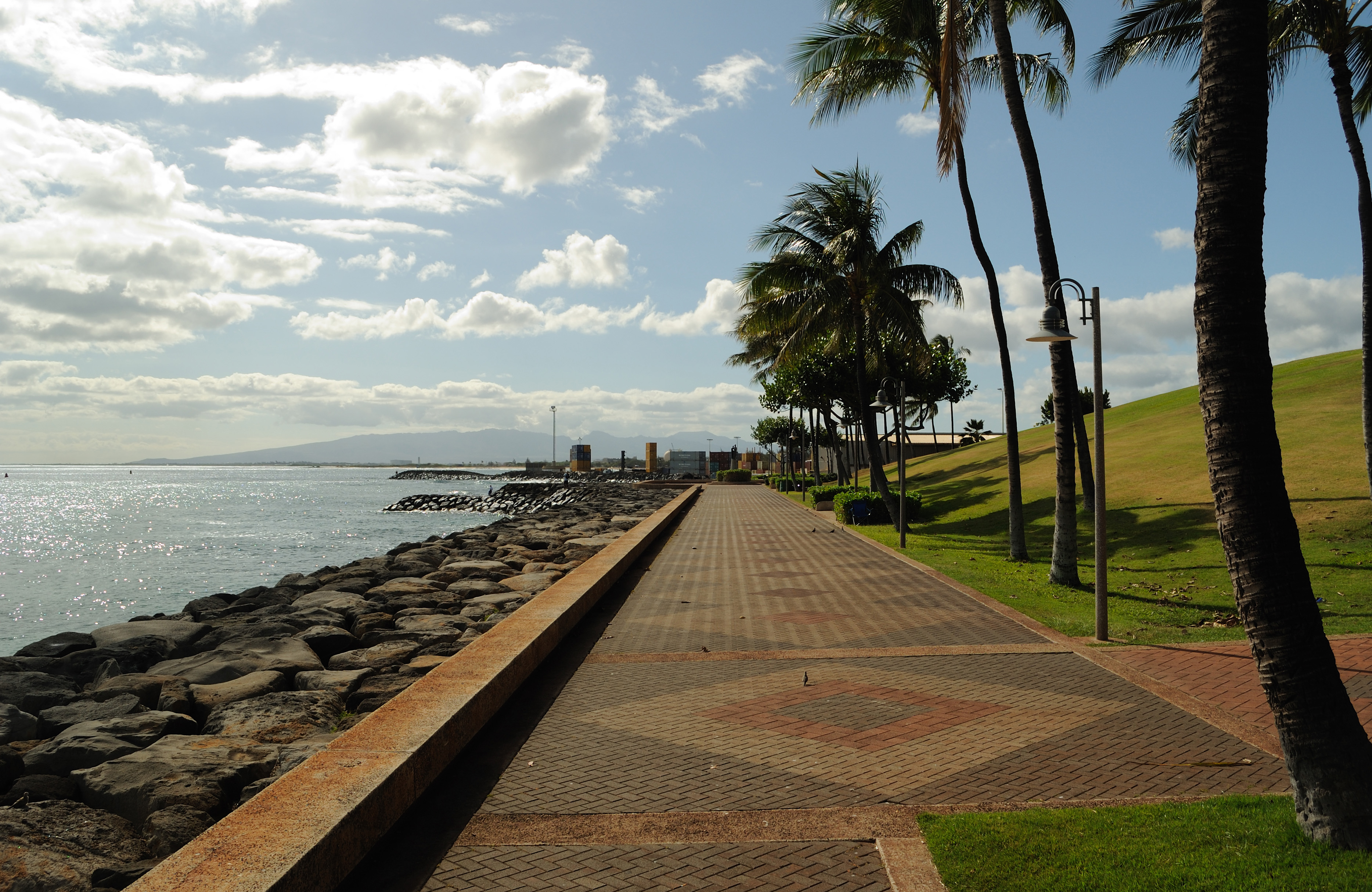
Kakaʻako Waterfront Park

Kakaʻako Waterfront Park, also known as "Point Panic Park", is a public park in Kakaʻako, south of downtown Honolulu, just off Ala Moana Boulevard at the end of Cooke Street. It was opened in November 1992 on the site of a former municipal landfill and consists of 35 acres (140,000 m^{2}) of grass-covered rolling hills adjacent to the ocean. There is no sandy beach at this location, and access to the ocean is by concrete stairs. The park has bathrooms, water fountains, free parking, picnic tables, an amphitheatre, pay telephones, paved jogging paths, and two popular surfing spots, "Point Panic" and "Flies".

In October 2017, the park was closed in order to address homeless people setting up encampments there then reopened in January 2018.

Management of Kakaʻako Waterfront Park was done by the Hawaiʻi Community Development Corporation for nearly 20 years. In late 2019, the 40 acres of land that makes up the Kakaʻako Waterfront Park was transferred from the state of Hawaii to the city of Honolulu.

The John A. Burns School of Medicine, part of the University of Hawaiʻi at Mānoa, is located inland and adjacent to the waterfront park.

A Memorial to the Ehime Maru Incident victims is built at the Kakaʻako Waterfront Park.

== Sculptures in the park ==
- Lahui, a silicon bronze sheet sculpture by Sean K. L. Browne, 1992
- Ano Lani, a bronze sculpture by Frank Sheriff, 1993
- A monument to the dead of the Ehime Maru and USS Greeneville collision

== Gallery ==
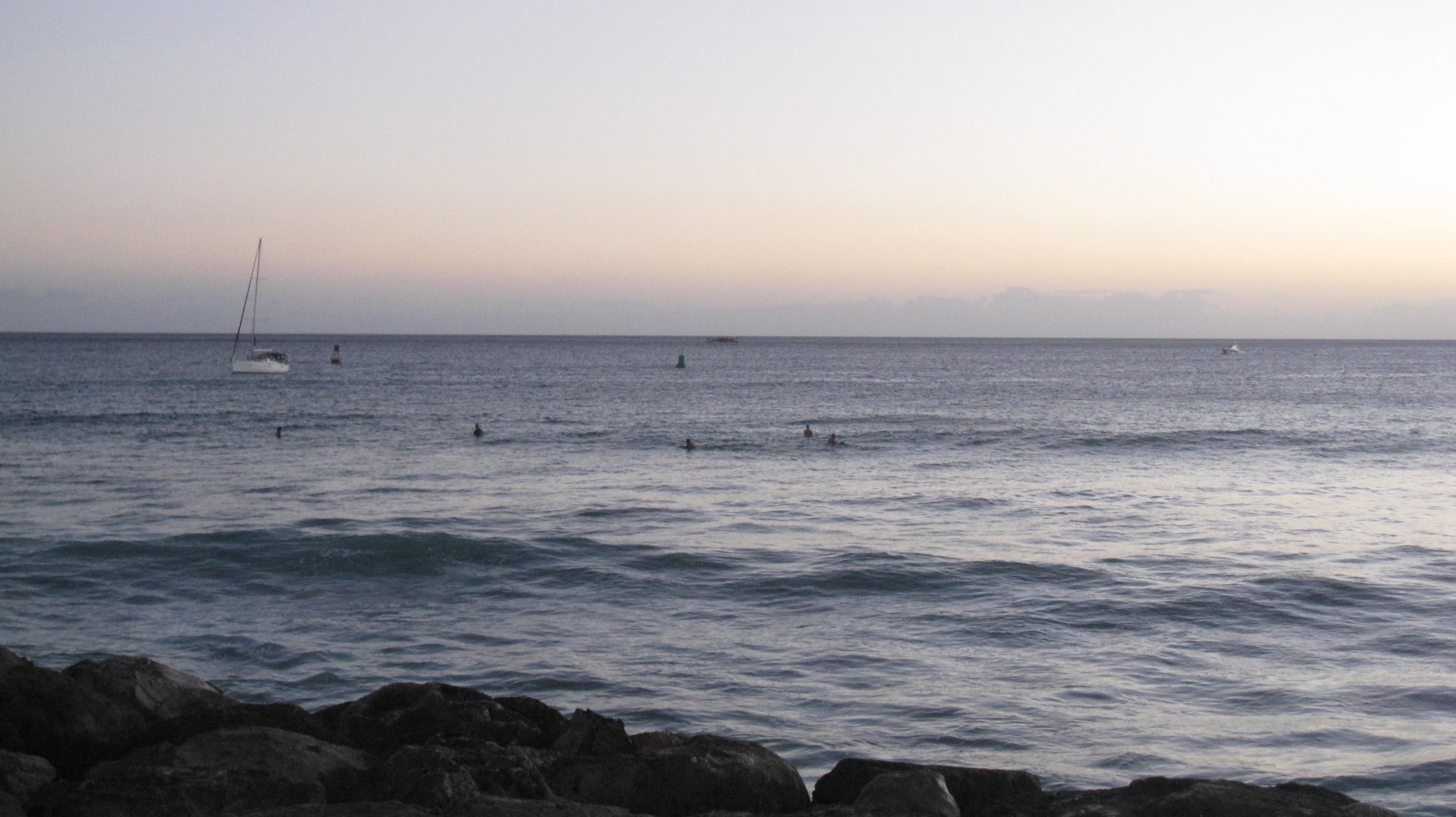
Bodysurfing area at Kaka'ako Waterfront Park

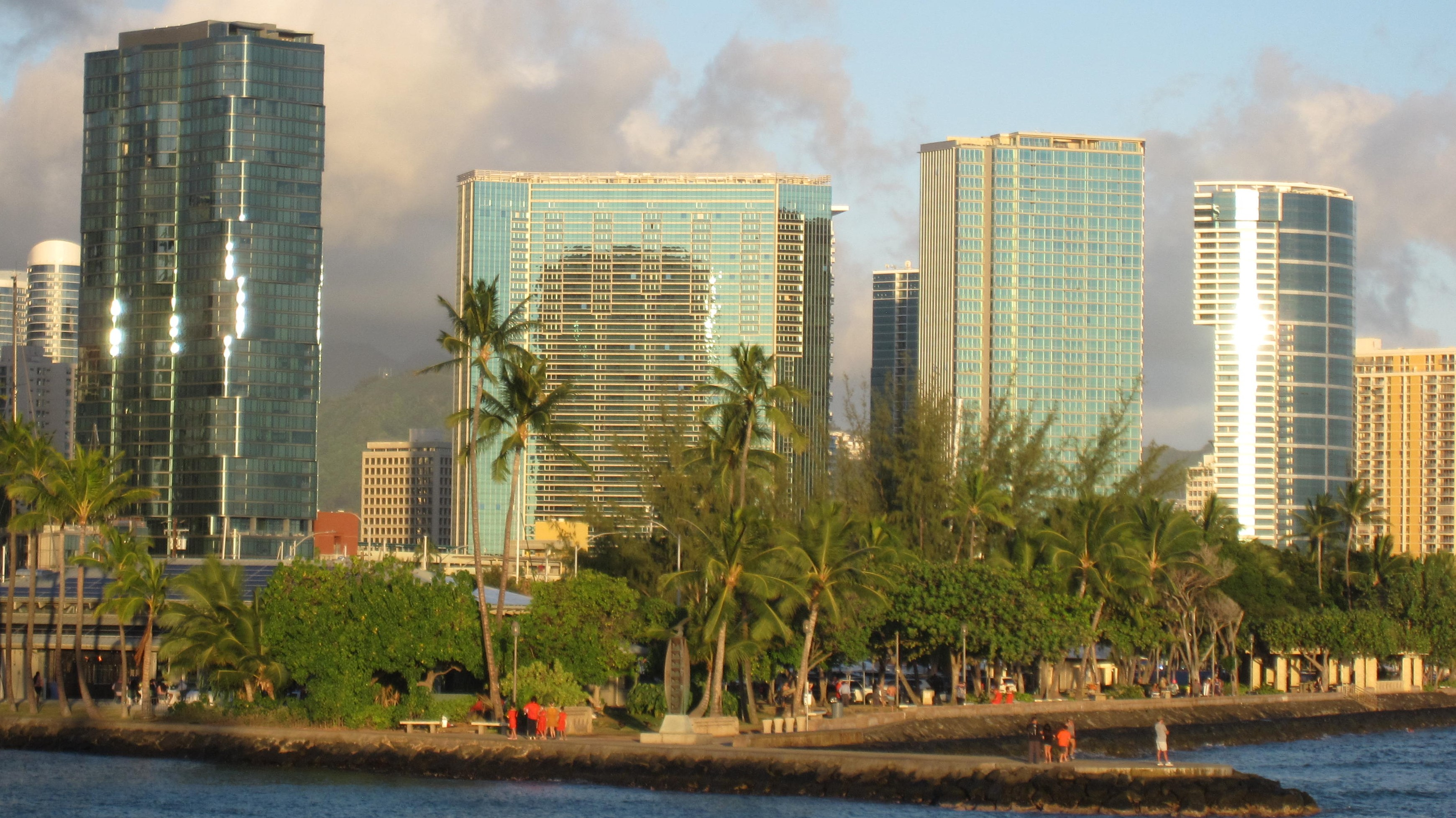
Skyline panorama from Kaka'ako Waterfront Park

== See also ==
- List of contemporary amphitheatres
