= Tasaka Guri-Guri =

Sherbet shop in Kahului, Maui, Hawaii

Guri-guri
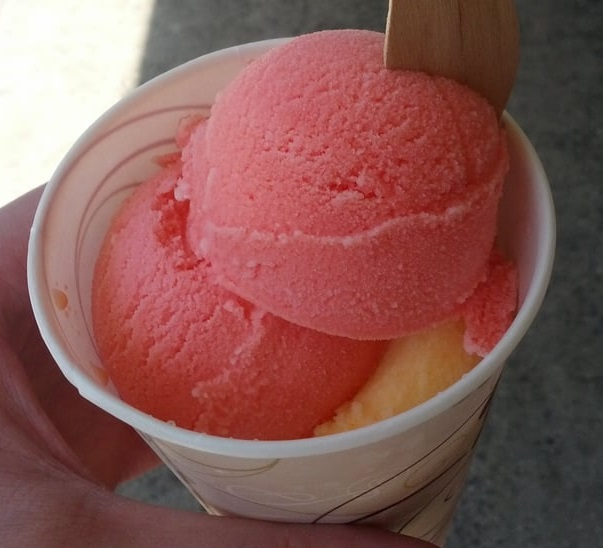
- Two scoops of strawberry, one scoop of pineapple guri-guri
- Type: Sherbet
- Course: Dessert
- Region or state: Hawaii
- Created by: Jokichi Tasaka
- Serving temperature: Cold
- Main ingredients: Fruit juice, lemon-lime soda, condensed milk
- Variations: Strawberry, pineapple

Tasaka Guri-Guri is a shop located in Kahului, Maui, Hawaii that specializes in a sherbet known as guri-guri.

== History ==
Jokichi Tasaka first made guri-guri in the early 1900s while living in Japan. Jokichi called the dessert "goodie-goodie," as in something "good" to eat. His son Gunji Tasaka came to realize that it was difficult for the older Japanese people to pronounce the name, so he began to call it "guri-guri". Gunji Tasaka later migrated to the United States and continued to run the family business.

Tasaka Guri-Guri has operated for over 100 years. The Tasaka family's business started with a store in Kahului, Maui. It then moved to Wailuku for a year, before returning to Kahului to the former Kahului Shopping Center for a couple of decades. It finally relocated to the Maui Mall in Kahului, where it has been since 1973.

Tasaka Guri-Guri was honored in 2009 by the Japanese Cultural Center of Hawaii for being "one of five local businesses that have stood the test of time and become inspiring stories of success."

== Recipe ==
The typical ingredients of guri-guri are a mixture of flavored juices, guava juice, lemon-lime soda, and condensed milk. Tasaka Guri-Guri is offered in two flavors, pineapple and strawberry.

Tasaka Guri-Guri's recipe has been kept a secret for over a century. In the early 2000s only Henry Tasaka, who was retired from the shop, and his two daughters, Gail and Cindy Tasaka, who took over the family business, knew the recipe.

== In media ==
On Sunday, November 22, 2026, the shop, family, and its guri-guri were featured on CBS News Sunday Morning.
