= Kanahā Pond State Wildlife Sanctuary =

Protected area in Hawaii, United States

- IUCN category V (protected landscape/seascape)
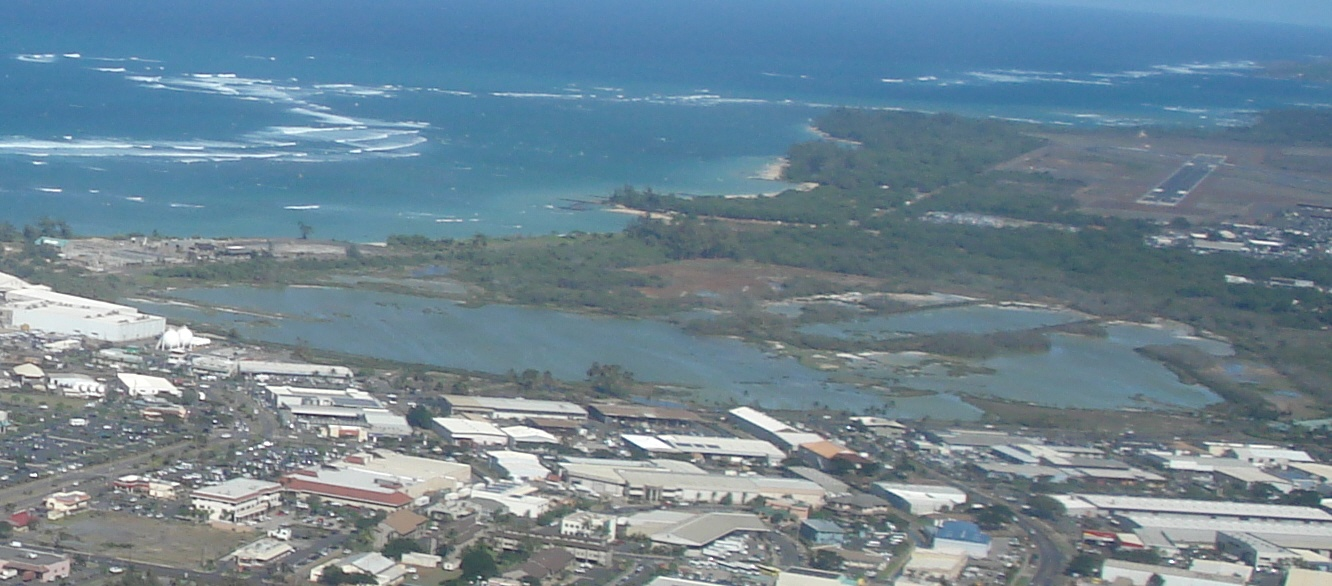
- Air view of Kanaha Pond

- Location within Hawaii
- Location: Maui, Hawaiʻi
- Coordinates: 20°53′42″N 156°27′32″W
- Area: 208 acres (84 ha)
- Established: 1951

U.S. National Natural Landmark
- Designated: June 1971

Kanahā Pond State Wildlife Sanctuary (KPSWS) is a 208-acre wetland in Kahului on the island of Maui, Hawaiʻi. The brackish-water sanctuary, situated between the ocean, an urban and commercial area, and Kahului International Airport, is home to many native plant and animal species, including over 100 native plants and invertebrate species, and 86 bird species. These bird species include several state and federally endangered water birds. The origins of the KPSWS can be traced back to the 1700s, when it was once the site of royal fishponds. Today, KPSWS is the focus of conservation efforts.

== History ==
Since its founding, KPSWS has gone through many structural changes that have affected its ecology and function. Today, KPSWS is a flood control basin and wildlife sanctuary that has been highly modified from its original state as a fully functioning wetland.

How KPSWS Has Changed Over Time

During his reign in the 1700s, the King of Maui, Kapiʻiohookalani built two royal fish ponds. One fishpond was named Mauʻoni and the other would go on to be named Kanahā during the Kamehameha dynasty in the 1800s in honor of Kapiʻiohookalani's daughter. As a fishpond, the pond was fed by natural springs and provided a constant source of food during the annual four-month fish breeding period when Kanaka Maoli (Native Hawaiians) were banned from catching fish in the ocean. In the early 1900s, during the construction of the nearby Kahului Harbor, half of the Kanahā fishpond was filled with rubble and dredged materials, which greatly altered the pond. During World War II, the military took control of the pond and surrounding areas, building a Naval air station, roads, bunkers, and a drainage outlet. In the 1970s and 1980s, drainage culverts were constructed along the east and west sides of KPSWS to divert stormwater runoff. These culverts resulted in reduced recharge and water circulation rates within the pond.

Status and Recognition

KPSWS became Hawaiʻi's first wildlife sanctuary in 1951 when the Territory of Hawaiʻi's Board of Agriculture and Forestry recognized the area as a Waterfowl Sanctuary. In 1971, KPSWS was designated as a National Park Service National Natural Landmark.

Today, KPSWS land is owned by the State of Hawaiʻi's Department of Transportation (DOT), but is managed as a wildlife refuge by the Division of Forest and Wildlife (DOFAW). This arrangement was the result of a 1973 inter-agency agreement between the DOT and Department of Land and Natural Resources (DLNR).

== Wildlife Habitat and Conservation ==
KPSWS is one of just two major wetland habitats on Maui, and one of the few remaining brackish-water ecosystems on the island. The area is also the oldest wetland that is managed by DLNR's DOFAW. In recent years, efforts to protect and conserve KPSWS have been underway.

As of January 2024, the DLNR hired Pono Pacific Management to build a 14,785 foot-long predator-exclusion fence around KPSWS to prevent predators and harmful species, like cats, dogs, pigs, rats, and deer from entering the sanctuary. The fence has a cover at the top that will make it difficult for predators to enter the area. Once completed, the fence will become the longest predator-exclusion fence in the United States.

Examples of Birds Found in KPSWS (non-exhaustive)

- ʻAlae Keʻokeʻo (Hawaiian Coot, Fulica alai) – endangered
- Aeʻo (Hawaiian Stilt, Himantopus mexicanus knudseni) – endangered
- Nēnē (Hawaiian Goose, Branta sandvicensis) – endangered
- ʻAukuʻu (Black-Crowned Night Heron, Nycticorax nycticorax hoactli)
- Kōlea (Pacific Golden-Pluver, Pluvialis fulva)
- ‘Ua‘u kani (Wedge-Tailed Shearwater, Ardenna pacifica, Puffinus pacificus)

== Gallery ==
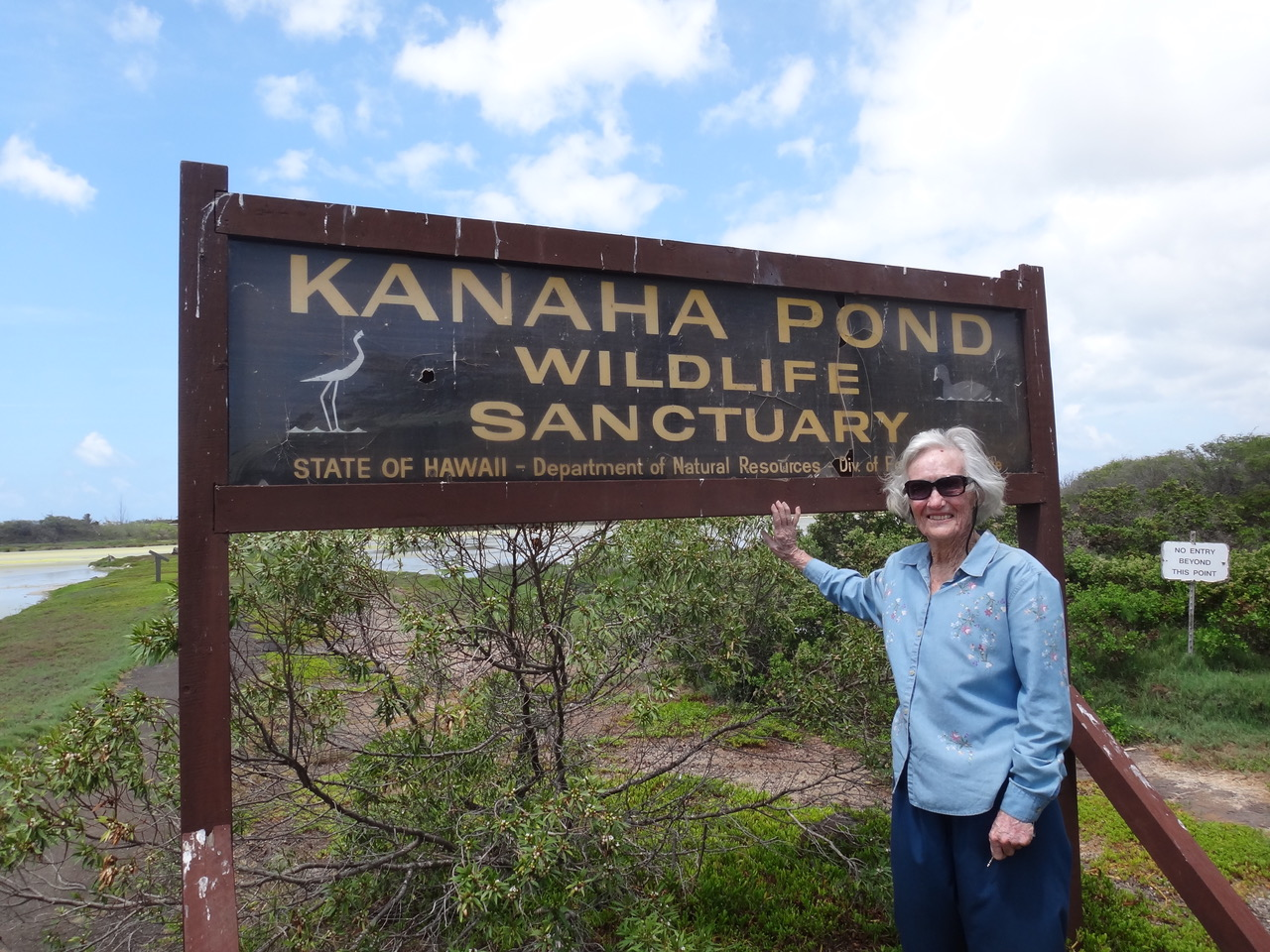
KPSWS Sign

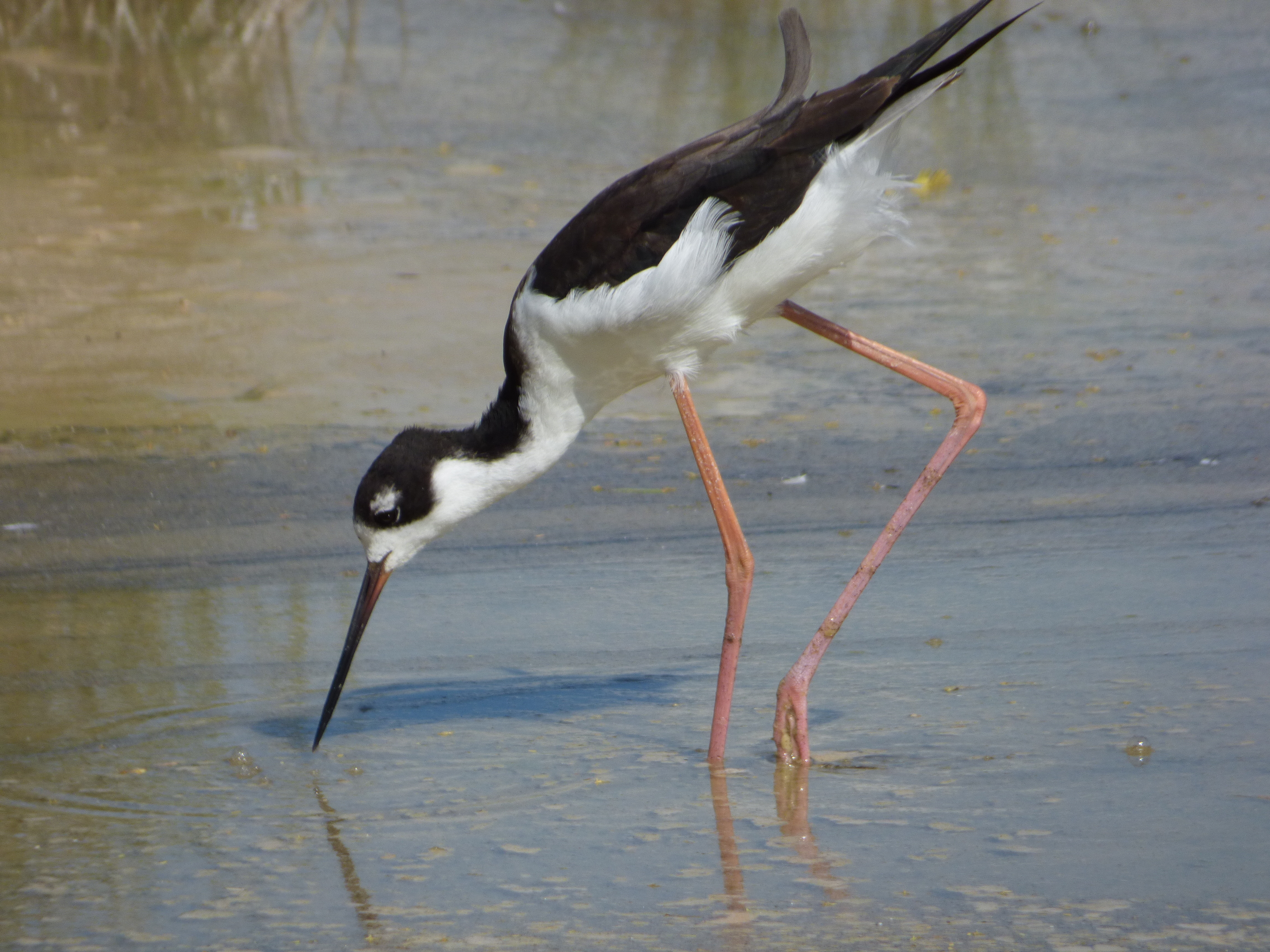
Aeʻo (Hawaiian Stilt) at Kanahā Pond.

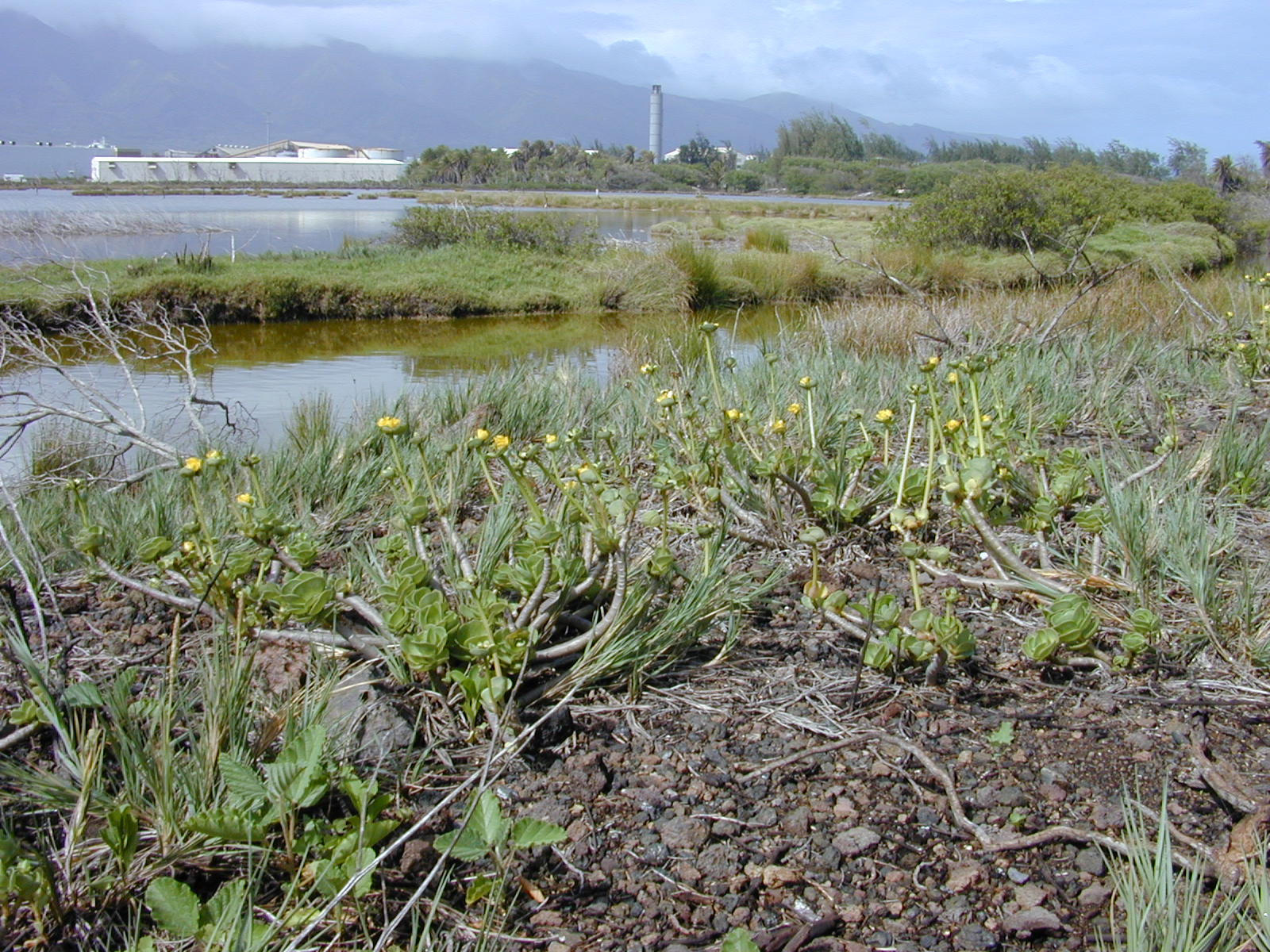
Portulaca molokiniensis growing at Kanaha Pond

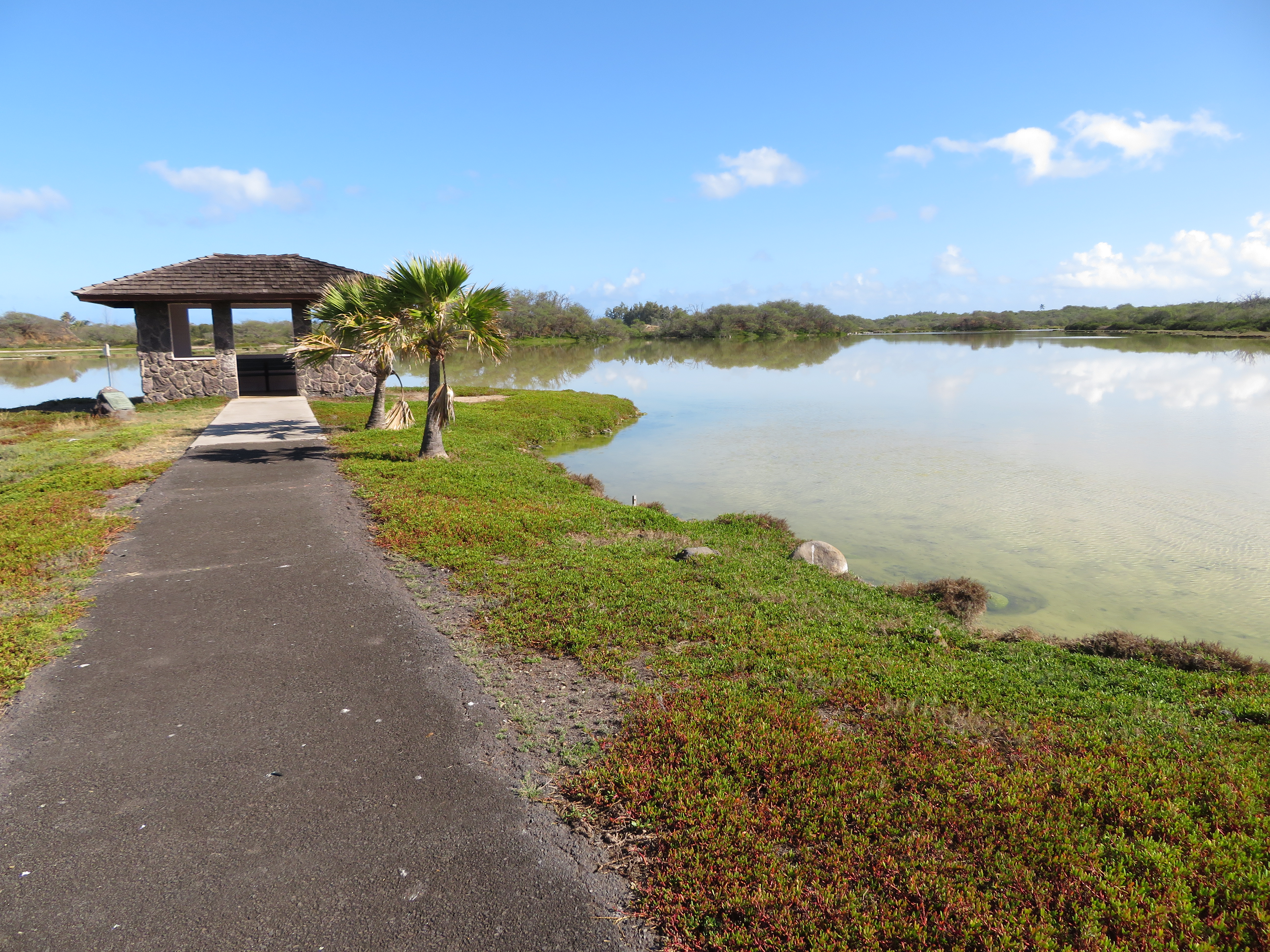
Viewing shelter at KPSWS

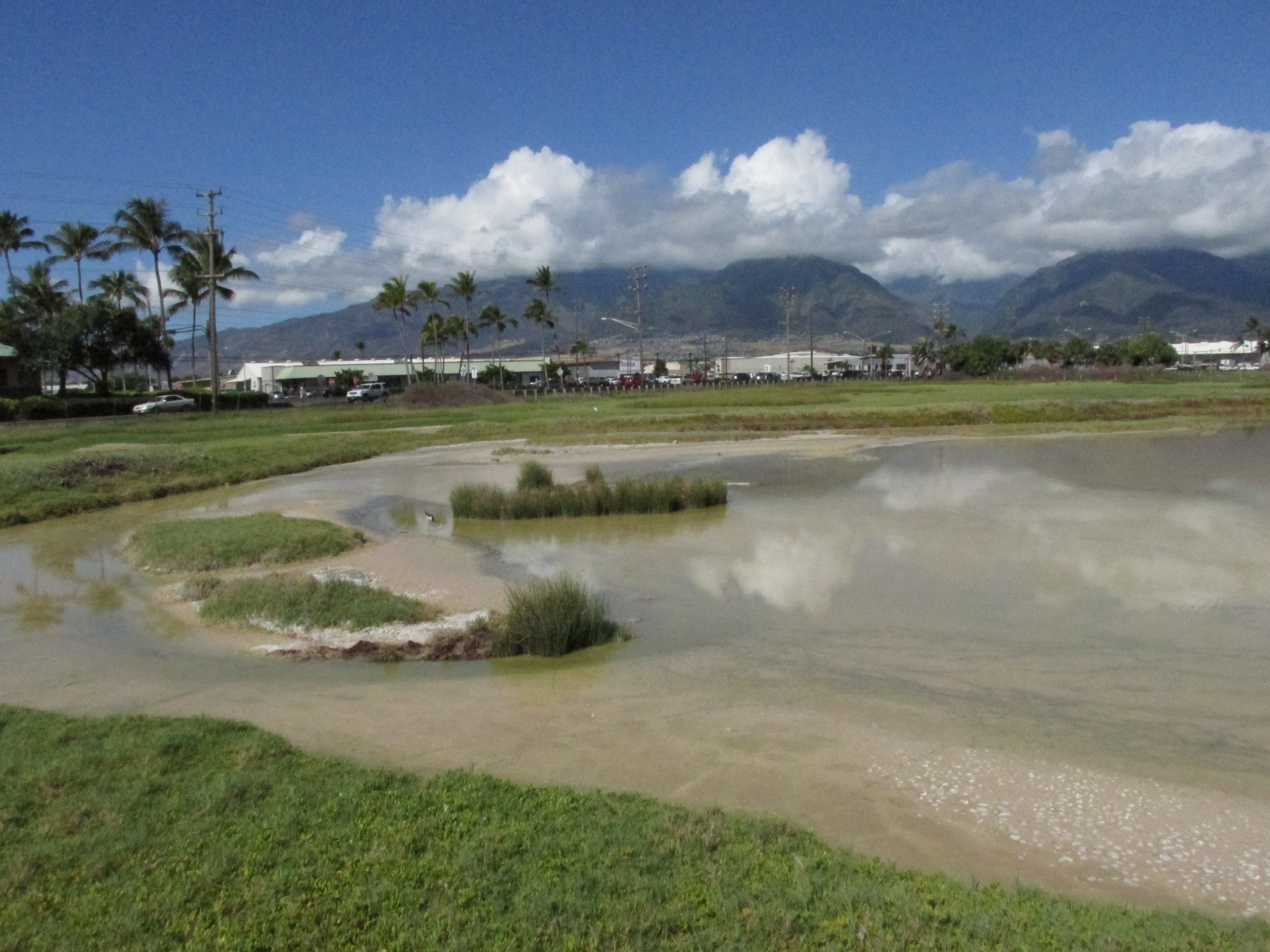
KPSWS
