= Frank Sheriff =

American sculptor

Mind and Heart, bronze sculpture by Frank Sheriff, 1995, University of Hawaii at Manoa

Frank Sheriff (born 1957) is an abstract sculptor who was born in Yokohama, Japan to an American father and a Japanese-American mother. Because his father was employed by the United States Army, Frank lived in Japan, Nevada, California, New York, Texas, North Carolina, and Hawaii during his childhood. He started studying art at Oregon State University but returned to Hawaii to be with his mother when his father died in 1980. He entered the University of Hawaii at Manoa, where he earned a BFA in 1984, and an MFA in 1989.

Frank Sheriff is known for both abstract and representational metal sculptures. His work is in the collection of the Hawaii State Art Museum. His sculptures in public places include:

- Ano Lani, a 1993 bronze sculpture at Kakaako Waterfront Park, Honolulu, Hawaii
- Mind and Heart, a 1995 cast bronze sculpture at the University of Hawaii at Manoa, Honolulu, Hawaii
- New Millenium Sky: Banyan and Stars, a 2000 aluminum sculpture at Princess Kaiulani Elementary School, Honolulu, Hawaii
