= Charles Gittins =

American lawyer (1956-2024)

- Born: October 26, 1956; Wilkes Barre, Pennsylvania
- Died: May 17, 2024 (aged 67); Martinsburg, West Virginia
- Military career
- Branch: United States Marine Corps; United States Marine Corps Reserve
- Service years: 1979-1992 (active duty); 1992-1995 (reserve)
- Rank: Lieutenant Colonel
- Nickname: Charlie
- Unit: United States Marine Corps Judge Advocate Division
- Conflicts: Gulf War
- Other work: Lawyer who specializes in military cases

Charles William Gittins (October 26, 1956 – May 17, 2024) was an American lawyer, who worked for a number of noteworthy defendants in military courts martial.

Gittins attended the United States Naval Academy, graduating in 1979. He then joined the Marine Corps where he served as a Radar Intercept Officer.

Gittins graduated first in his class from The Catholic University of America's Columbus School of Law in 1987 and was in the Judge Advocate Corps for six years, before entering civilian life. The first civilian firm Gittins worked for was Williams & Connolly. While there he defended Robert E. Stumpf, commander of the Blue Angels, and one of the principals in the Tailhook scandal. He spent three and a half years there before founding his own firm.

Gittins died on May 17, 2024, while under hospice care in Martinsburg, West Virginia.

== Clients ==
Notable clients
| Lieutenant Ilario Pantano | United States Marine Corps who was cleared of shooting two unarmed Iraqi captives, then desecrating their bodies in order "to send a message". |
| Specialist Charles Graner | Military Police reservist involved in the Abu Ghraib scandal. |
| Major Harry "Psycho" Schmidt | Former instructor from the United States Navy's TOPGUN school who bombarded a platoon of Canadians in Afghanistan, even though he had been directed to hold his fire. |
| Commander Scott Waddle | Captain of the USS GREENEVILLE, during the conduct of an emergency surface maneuver, the GREENEVILLE collided with the Japanese Fishery training vessel Ehime Maru which sank in 2000 feet of water off the coast of Oahu (see Ehime Maru and USS Greeneville collision). |
| Captain Christopher M. Beiring | Commanded the troops at the Bagram Theater Internment Facility, which beat two Afghani captives to death with "compliance blows". |
| Captain Randy W. Stone | Stone was a Marine Judge Advocate officer against whom charges were recommended for failing to formally investigate the Haditha incident where a squad of Marines methodically shot and killed two dozen nearby civilian families after a well-liked comrade was killed by a roadside bomb. |
