= University of Hawaiʻi Maui College =

Public college in Kahului, Hawaiʻi, U.S.

- Former names: Maui Vocational School (1931–1958); Maui Technical School (1958–1966); Maui Community College (1966–2010)
- Motto: Maluna aʻe o nā lāhui a pau ke ola o ke kanaka (Hawaiian)
- Motto in English: "Above all nations is humanity"
- Type: Public college
- Established: 1931; 95 years ago
- Parent institution: University of Hawaiʻi
- Accreditation: WSCUC
- Academic affiliations: Space-grant
- Endowment: $341.7 million (system-wide) (2020)
- Chancellor: Lui Hokoana
- President: David Lassner
- Undergraduates: 3,318 (2017)
- Location: Kahului, Hawaii, United States; 20.891°N 156.479°W
- Campus: 78 acres (0.32 km^{2}); Small City
- Newspaper: Ho'oulu
- Other campuses: Lahaina; Hāna; Molokaʻi; Lānaʻi
- Colors: UHMC Blue
- Website: maui.hawaii.edu

The University of Hawaiʻi Maui College (UHMC) is a public college in Kahului, Hawaiʻi, United States. Located on the island of Maui, it is one of ten branches of the University of Hawaiʻi system and is accredited by the Western Association of Schools and Colleges.

In addition to its main campus in Kahului, UHMC also runs four education centers within Maui County: Lahaina Education Center in Lahaina and Hāna Education Center in Hāna; Molokai Education Center on the island of Molokaʻi; and Lānai Education Center on the island of Lānaʻi.

== History ==
The University of Hawaiʻi, Maui College was founded in 1931 as the Maui Vocational School. In 1958 its name was changed to Maui Technical School. The college was incorporated into the University of Hawaiʻi System on July 1, 1965, after the Hawaiʻi State Legislature enacted the Community College Act which established a statewide community college system under the UH System.

In 1966 its name was changed to Maui Community College after the UH Board of Regents authorized the college to confer degrees in Associates in Arts and Associates in Science.

In Spring of 2010, the Western Association of Schools and Colleges (WASC) Accreditation Board approved the name change from Maui Community College to University of Hawaiʻi Maui College. The name change was changed in order to provide a more accurate reflection of UH Maui College's three baccalaureate degrees.

== Campus ==
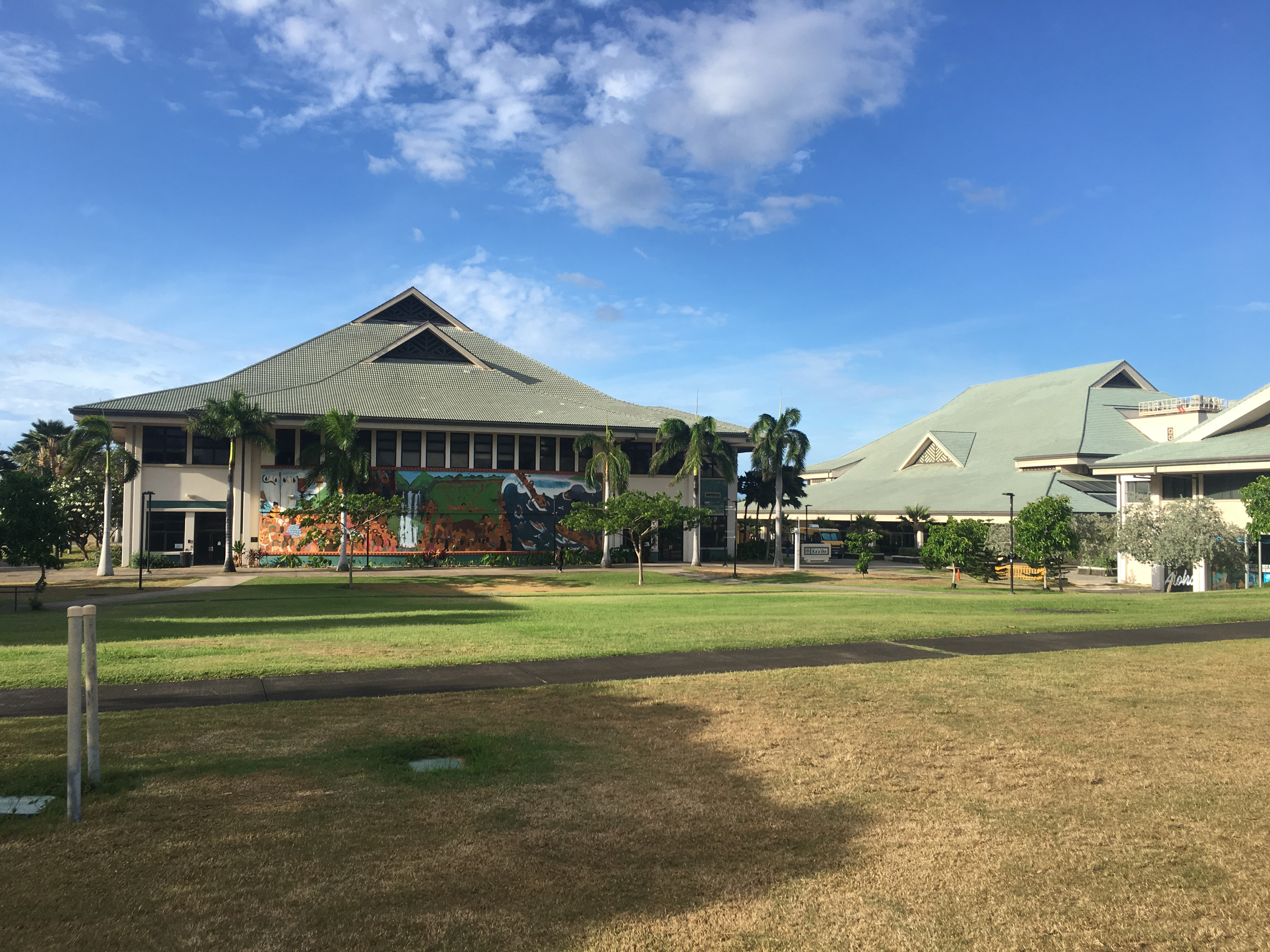
University of Hawaii Maui College campus, September 2019

=== Campus buildings ===
- Kaʻaʻike
- Laulima
- Hoʻokipa
- Ka Lama
- Kūpaʻa
- The Learning Center
- Noiʻi
- ʻIke Leʻa
- Pāʻina
- Pilina

=== Campus art ===
Campus art includes:

- Alakahi, coral sculpture by Peter Bal, 1976
- Maui, wood and metal sculpture by Kim Chung, 1973
- Na Moku ʻEkolu (Three Islands), cast and welded silicon bronze sculpture by Sean K. L. Browne, 1985
- Wind and Sea, bronze sculpture by Bruce Turnbull, 1992
- Dolphin, stainless steel sculpture by Linlee Boulet, Eric T. Sato, Gwen Brush and John Ringer, 1987

== Academics ==
UHMC offers associate degrees, Bachelor of Applied Science degrees, and certificates.

Undergraduate demographics as of Fall 2023
Race and ethnicity	Total
Asian	32%
Two or more races	29%
Hispanic	15%
White	13%
Native Hawaiian/Pacific Islander	7%
Black	1%
International student	1%
Unknown	1%
Economic diversity
Low-income (Note: The percentage of students who received an income-based federal Pell grant intended for low-income students.)	35%
Affluent (Note: The percentage of students who are a part of the American middle class at the bare minimum.)	65%
