= USS Hartford and USS New Orleans collision =

Accident at sea

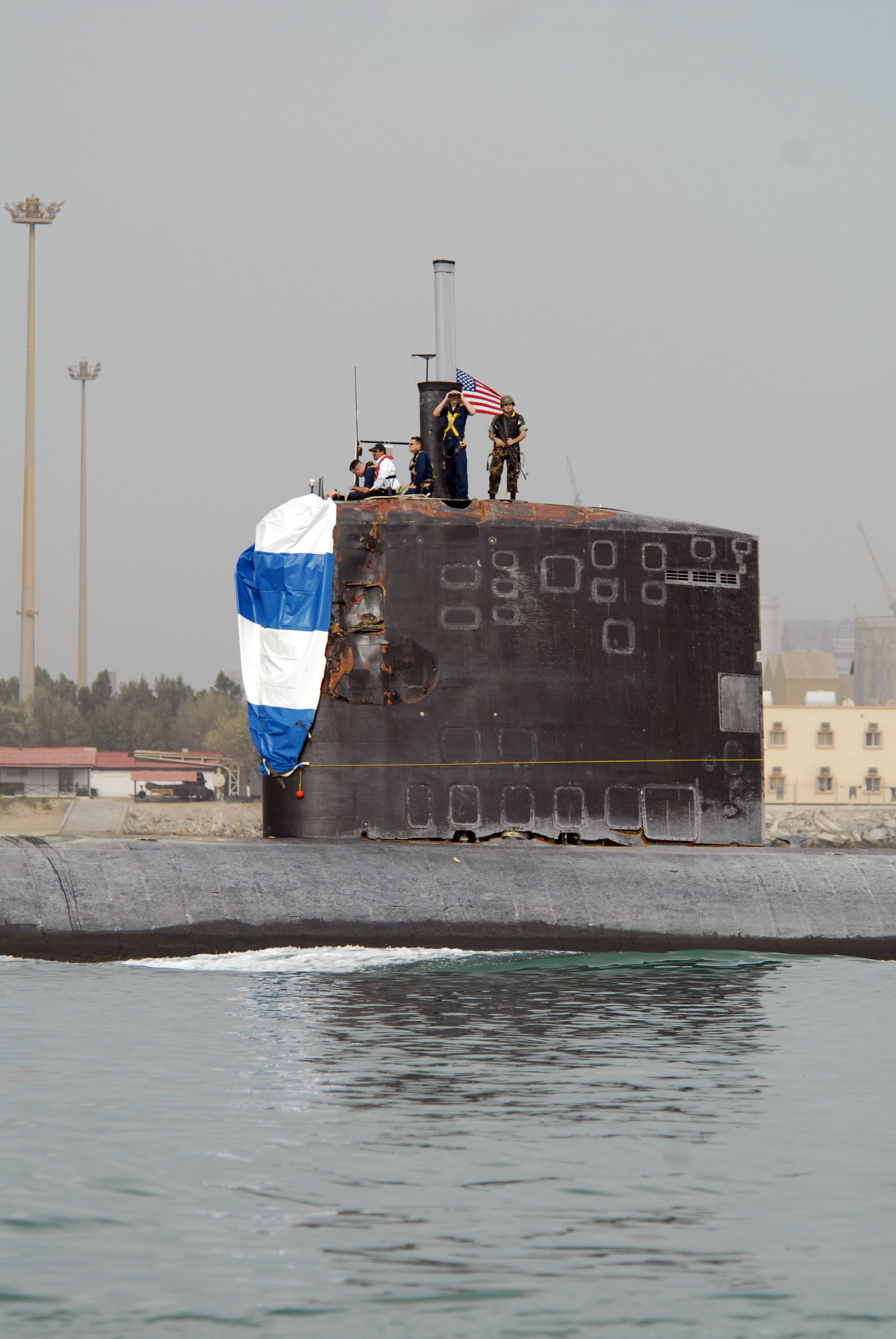
- USS Hartford in Bahrain a day after the collision
- Date: 20 March 2009
- Place: Strait of Hormuz, between Iran and the United Arab Emirates
- Cause: Ship collision
- Result: Both vessels damaged, 25,000 gallons marine diesel spilled, 15 Hartford crewmembers injured

The USS Hartford and USS New Orleans collision was a collision between the United States Navy Los Angeles-class submarine USS Hartford and the United States Navy San Antonio-class amphibious transport dock USS New Orleans on 20 March 2009. It occurred in the Strait of Hormuz, between Iran, the United Arab Emirates, and Musandam, an exclave of Oman. Both ships incurred millions of dollars' worth of damage in the collision which required repair in drydock.

A U.S. Navy investigation into the collision found that Hartford was solely to blame for the accident. According to the Navy, the accident was caused by poor, lax leadership on the submarine and a failure to adequately prepare for and conduct the crossing of the Hormuz Strait by the crew. As a result, the captain and several other officers and sailors were removed or disciplined.

== Collision ==
The collision occurred about 1:00 am local time (5:00 pm EST, 19 March 2009) as Hartford and New Orleans transited the Strait of Hormuz. The collision inflicted minor injuries on 15 sailors on Hartford and ruptured a fuel tank on New Orleans, spilling 25,000 US gal (95,000 L) of diesel fuel. Both vessels continued on under their own power. Hartford was submerged and at periscope depth at the time of the collision. The vessel was southbound en route to Jebel Ali, while New Orleans was westbound to enter the Persian Gulf as part of the Boxer Amphibious Ready Group.

Hartford is believed to have rolled about 85° during the collision and sustained extensive damage to its sail, periscope and port bow plane, totalling over $100 million. There was no damage to the nuclear reactor. An inspection of New Orleans in Manama, Bahrain by Navy divers found a 16 by 18 ft (4.9 by 5.5 m) hole in the ship's hull, a ruptured fuel tank, and interior damage to two ballast tanks.

== Aftermath ==
The Navy announced 14 April 2009 that Hartford's skipper, Commander Ryan Brookhart, was relieved of duty by Rear Admiral Michael J. Connor because of a loss of confidence in Brookhart's ability to command. The Chief of the Boat, Master Chief Electronics Technician Stefan Prevot, was also relieved. Brookhart was replaced by Commander Chris Harkins, deputy commander of Submarine Squadron Eight. In addition, the navigator, executive officer, weapons officer and 10 other sailors were subjected to non-judicial punishment. Furthermore, administrative action was taken against three direct support element members assigned to Naval Information Operations Command in Georgia plus a fleet intelligence specialist based near Washington, D.C.

On 19 April, Hartford began a surface transit back to the U.S. for further repair, arriving two months later. After reaching home port, the U.S. Navy made three repair contracts with General Dynamics Electric Boat for a total of $102.6 million. The repairs included the installation of a hull patch and a bridge access trunk, along with a portside retractable bow plane and sail. The final cost was $120 million when Hartford returned to duty in February, 2011.

New Orleans was repaired in Bahrain for $2.3 million and returned to duty.

== Investigation findings ==
On 28 October 2009 Vice Admiral John J. Donnelly, Commander, Naval Submarine Force, explained that the primary cause of the collision was complacency and poor management on the part of Hartford's crew. According to Donnelly, "There was a great deal of complacency involved in the crew. They had been at sea for 63 days operating in areas with high contact density. There were a whole host of watchstanders that failed to recognize the sensor data that was presented to them."

The Judge Advocate General of the Navy investigation into the collision stated that the collision was solely the fault of Hartford. The report found numerous safety, operational, personnel, and command problems in the submarine. The problems included the captain's failure to communicate a plan for crossing the strait, poor contact management, a lax command attitude, and a failure to correct watchstanders who were known to sleep on duty. At the time of the collision, the navigator was listening to an iPod in the wardroom. Furthermore, the captain was never present in the control room at any time during the crossing of the strait.
