= Kahului, Hawaii =

- Census-designated place
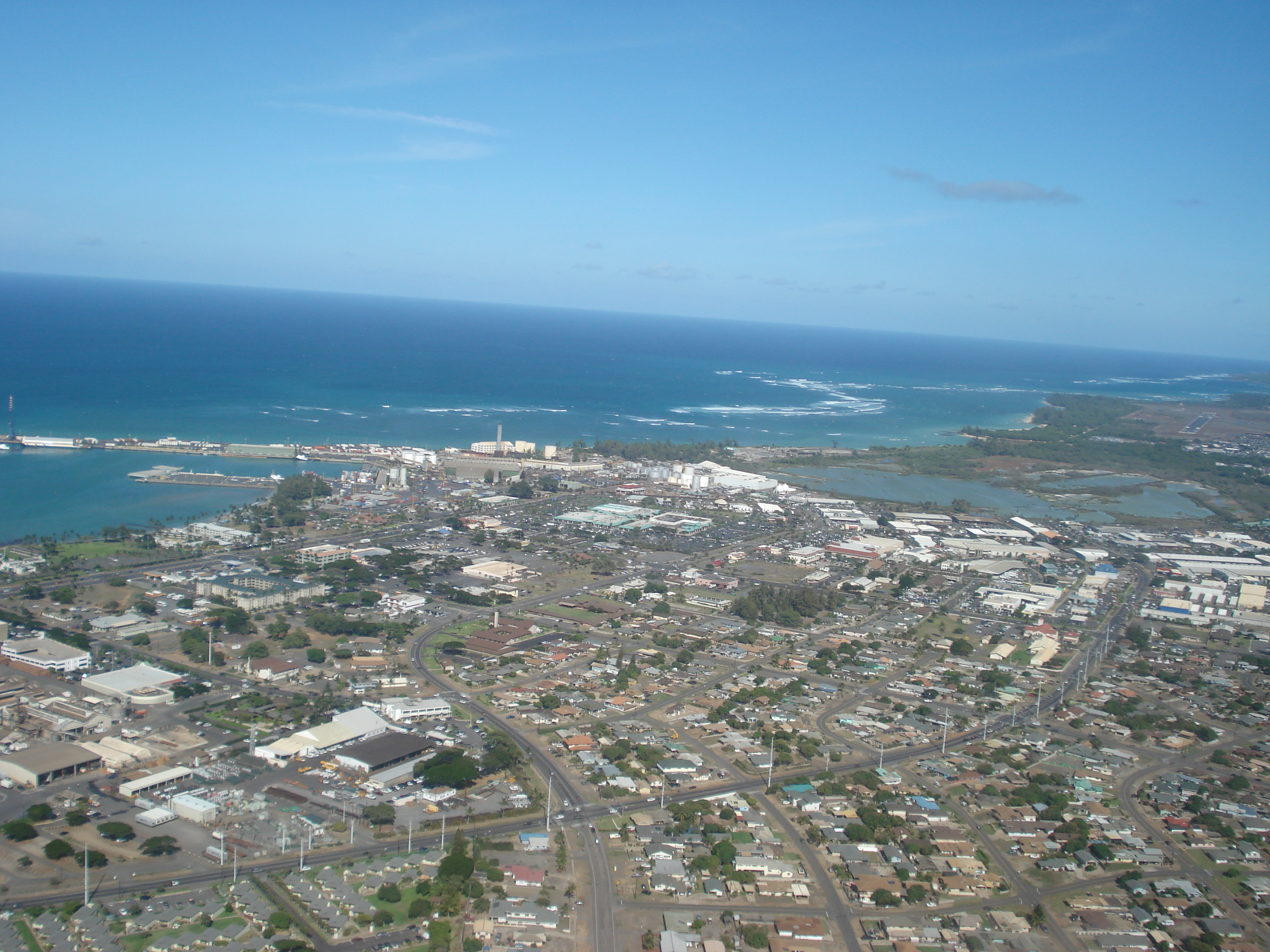
- Aerial view of Kahului from the southwest

- Location in Maui County and the state of Hawaii

- Location in Hawaii
- Coordinates: 20°52′54″N 156°28′3″W
- Country: United States
- State: Hawaii
- County: Maui

Area
  - Total: 16.03 sq mi (41.52 km^{2})
  - Land: 14.39 sq mi (37.26 km^{2})
  - Water: 1.64 sq mi (4.26 km^{2})
- Elevation: 30 ft (9 m)

Population (2020)
  - Total: 28,219
  - Density: 1,961.6/sq mi (757.38/km^{2})
- Time zone: UTC−10 (Hawaii-Aleutian)
- ZIP codes: 96732-96733
- Area code: 808
- FIPS code: 15-22700
- GNIS feature ID: 0359843

Kahului (Hawaiian pronunciation: [kəhuˈluwi]) is an unincorporated community and a census-designated place in Maui County in the U.S. state of Hawaii. It hosts the county's main airport (Kahului Airport), a deep-draft harbor, light industrial areas, and commercial shopping centers. The population was 28,219 at the 2020 census. Kahului is part of the Kahului-Wailuku-Lahaina Metropolitan Statistical Area which comprises all of Maui County, including nearby Wailuku and the West Maui town of Lahaina.

Kahului is a retail center for Maui County and contains several shopping centers, including the Queen Kaahumanu Center. Attractions in Kahului include the Alexander & Baldwin Sugar Museum, Kanaha Pond State Wildlife Sanctuary, Kanaha Beach County Park, and the Maui Arts and Cultural Center.

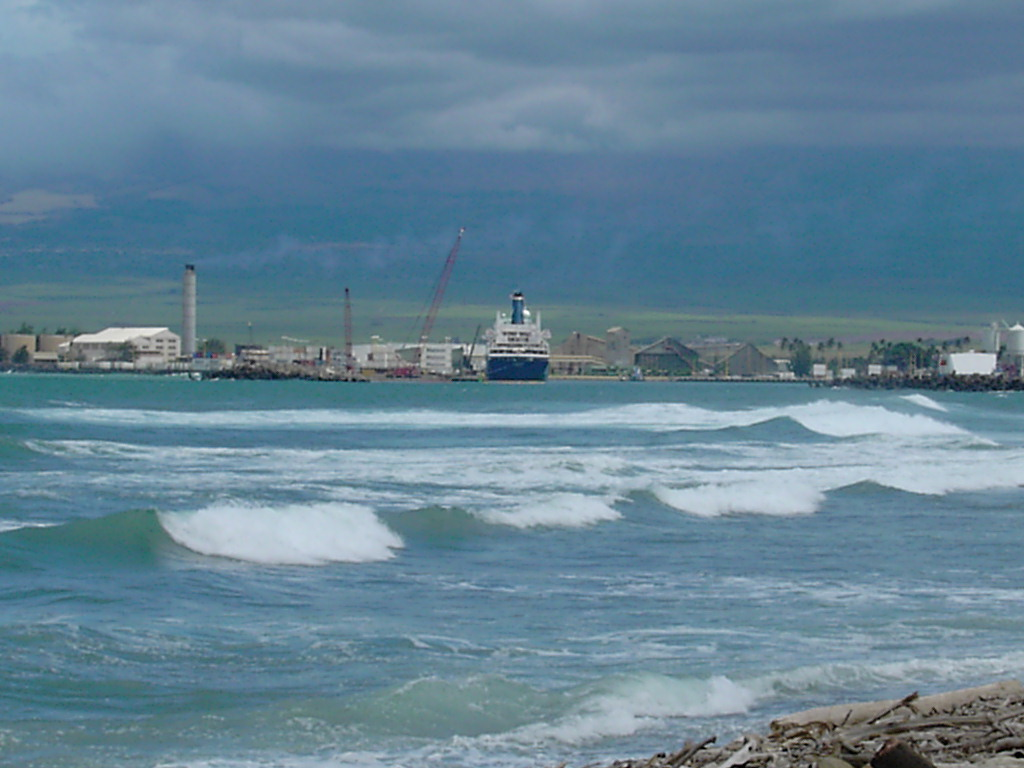
Kahului harbor is on the city’s north shore

== Geography ==
Kahului is on the north central side of the island of Maui on the shore of Kahului Bay. It is bordered to the west by Wailuku, to the southwest by Waikapu, and to the east by Kahului Airport and Spreckelsville.

According to the United States Census Bureau, the total area of the census-designated place (CDP) of Kahului is 16 square miles (41 km^{2}), of which 14.3 sq mi (37 km^{2}) are land and 1.6 sq mi (4.1 km^{2}), or 10.26%, are water.

=== Climate ===
Kahului is located on the leeward side of Maui relative to the trade winds, giving it a hot semi-arid climate with a dry summer season (Köppen classification zone BSh). The normal monthly mean temperature ranges from 71.8 °F (22.1 °C) in February to 79.7 °F (26.5 °C). On average, there are 21 nights annually with a low below 60 °F (16 °C) and 25 days with a high at or above 90 °F (32 °C); readings of 95 °F (35 °C) or higher are far rarer, occurring on average once every five years. Temperature records range from 48 °F (9 °C) on January 20, 1969, up to 97 °F (36 °C) on August 31, 1994, and August 22, 2015. The record cool daily maximum is 65 °F (18 °C) on February 28, 1990, and the record warm daily minimum is 79 °F (26 °C) on October 8 and 17, 1979.

Normal annual rainfall is 17.83 inches (453 mm) spread over an average 95 days, but observed annual rainfall has ranged from 6.76 in (172 mm) in 1908 and 1998 to 40.63 in (1,032 mm) in 1989. The wettest month on record is March 2026 with 21.11 in (536 mm), while the most rain to occur in a single calendar day is 7.40 in (188 mm) on March 13, 2026. The most recent month without measurable (≥0.01 in or 0.25 mm) rain is October 2013 with trace amounts, and the last without any rain is June 1957. The town is also one of the windiest places in the U.S., averaging 12.8 miles per hour.

Climate data for Kahului Airport, Hawaii (1991−2020 normals, extremes 1905−present)
Month	Jan	Feb	Mar	Apr	May	Jun	Jul	Aug	Sep	Oct	Nov	Dec	Year
Record high °F (°C)	90 (32)	90 (32)	90 (32)	91 (33)	96 (36)	95 (35)	97 (36)	97 (36)	97 (36)	96 (36)	96 (36)	90 (32)	97 (36)
Mean maximum °F (°C)	85.7 (29.8)	86.0 (30.0)	86.5 (30.3)	87.5 (30.8)	89.3 (31.8)	90.5 (32.5)	92.0 (33.3)	92.3 (33.5)	92.6 (33.7)	91.6 (33.1)	89.3 (31.8)	86.6 (30.3)	93.8 (34.3)
Mean daily maximum °F (°C)	82.2 (27.9)	82.2 (27.9)	82.9 (28.3)	84.5 (29.2)	86.5 (30.3)	88.3 (31.3)	89.2 (31.8)	89.9 (32.2)	90.0 (32.2)	88.7 (31.5)	85.8 (29.9)	83.3 (28.5)	86.1 (30.1)
Daily mean °F (°C)	72.9 (22.7)	73.0 (22.8)	74.0 (23.3)	75.5 (24.2)	77.1 (25.1)	79.3 (26.3)	80.5 (26.9)	81.1 (27.3)	80.6 (27.0)	79.4 (26.3)	77.1 (25.1)	74.6 (23.7)	77.1 (25.1)
Mean daily minimum °F (°C)	63.6 (17.6)	63.8 (17.7)	65.1 (18.4)	66.6 (19.2)	67.7 (19.8)	70.3 (21.3)	71.8 (22.1)	72.3 (22.4)	71.2 (21.8)	70.1 (21.2)	68.4 (20.2)	65.9 (18.8)	68.1 (20.1)
Mean minimum °F (°C)	55.6 (13.1)	55.6 (13.1)	57.2 (14.0)	59.8 (15.4)	60.9 (16.1)	64.0 (17.8)	65.0 (18.3)	65.6 (18.7)	64.7 (18.2)	63.6 (17.6)	61.4 (16.3)	58.3 (14.6)	54.1 (12.3)
Record low °F (°C)	48 (9)	50 (10)	51 (11)	54 (12)	56 (13)	58 (14)	58 (14)	60 (16)	59 (15)	58 (14)	55 (13)	52 (11)	48 (9)
Average rainfall inches (mm)	2.42 (61)	2.00 (51)	2.64 (67)	1.32 (34)	0.71 (18)	0.17 (4.3)	0.53 (13)	0.53 (13)	0.45 (11)	0.83 (21)	1.81 (46)	2.80 (71)	16.21 (412)
Average rainy days (≥ 0.01 in)	8.3	9.1	10.2	8.6	6.1	4.8	7.7	7.4	5.0	6.5	9.2	10.0	92.9
Average relative humidity (%)	77.5	74.7	74.1	72.2	71.3	69.6	70.3	69.4	70.2	73.1	74.1	76.8	72.8
Mean monthly sunshine hours	218.4	210.1	239.6	235.6	275.3	290.1	293.5	284.6	270.7	247.0	211.6	213.1	2,989.6
Percentage possible sunshine	64	65	64	62	68	72	71	72	74	68	63	63	67
Source: NOAA (relative humidity and sun 1961−1990)

== Demographics ==
Historical population
Census	Pop.	Note	%±
1930	2,353		—
1940	2,193		−6.8%
1950	6,306		187.6%
1960	4,223		−33.0%
1970	8,173		93.5%
1980	12,978		58.8%
1990	16,889		30.1%
2000	20,146		19.3%
2010	26,337		30.7%
2020	28,219		7.1%
U.S. Decennial Census

=== 2020 census ===
As of the 2020 census, Kahului had a population of 28,219. The median age was 39.4 years. 23.8% of residents were under the age of 18 and 17.7% of residents were 65 years of age or older. For every 100 females there were 98.3 males, and for every 100 females age 18 and over there were 95.6 males age 18 and over.

99.3% of residents lived in urban areas, while 0.7% lived in rural areas.

There were 7,616 households in Kahului, of which 41.7% had children under the age of 18 living in them. Of all households, 48.4% were married-couple households, 17.8% were households with a male householder and no spouse or partner present, and 26.1% were households with a female householder and no spouse or partner present. About 20.3% of all households were made up of individuals and 11.0% had someone living alone who was 65 years of age or older.

There were 8,093 housing units, of which 5.9% were vacant. The homeowner vacancy rate was 0.6% and the rental vacancy rate was 5.1%.

Racial composition as of the 2020 census
Race	Number	Percent
White	2,967	10.5%
Black or African American	127	0.5%
American Indian and Alaska Native	103	0.4%
Asian	14,523	51.5%
Native Hawaiian and Other Pacific Islander	4,005	14.2%
Some other race	505	1.8%
Two or more races	5,989	21.2%
Hispanic or Latino (of any race)	2,400	8.5%

=== 2000 census ===
As of the 2000 Census, there were 20,146 people, 5,880 households, and 4,421 families in the CDP. The population density was 1,328.7 inhabitants per square mile (513.0/km^{2}). There were 6,079 housing units at an average density of 400.9 per square mile (154.8/km^{2}). The racial makeup of the CDP was 10.06% White, 0.24% Black or African American, 0.27% Native American, 53.62% Asian, 9.91% Pacific Islander, 1.47% from other races, and 24.42% from two or more races. 8.75% of the population were Hispanic or Latino of any race.

There were 5,880 households, 34.9% had children under the age of 18 living with them, 51.9% were married couples living together, 16.6% had a female householder with no husband present, and 24.8% were non-families. 20.3% of households were one person and 11.9% were one person aged 65 or older. The average household size was 3.29 and the average family size was 3.76.

The age distribution was 25.8% under the age of 18, 9.2% from 18 to 24, 27.6% from 25 to 44, 20.7% from 45 to 64, and 16.7% 65 or older. The median age was 36 years. For every 100 females, there were 97.3 males. For every 100 females age 18 and over, there were 95.8 males.

The median household income was $46,656 and the median family income was $52,610. Males had a median income of $30,659 versus $26,282 for females. The per capita income for the CDP was $18,049. 11.8% of the population and 9.7% of families were below the poverty line. Out of the total population, 14.8% of those under the age of 18 and 11.6% of those 65 and older were living below the poverty line.

== Economy ==
Major employers in Kahului include Walmart, Maui Electric Company, Macy's, Hale Makua Health Services, Aloha Air Cargo, Zippy's, Roberts Hawaii, and University of Hawaiʻi Maui College.

== Education ==
The statewide school district is the Hawaii Department of Education, and this district covers Kahului. Public schools in Kahului include Maui High School, Maui Waena Intermediate School, Kahului Elementary School, Lihikai Elementary School, and Pomaika'i Elementary School.

University of Hawaiʻi Maui College is in Kahului CDP.

The Hawaii State Public Library System operates the Kahului Library.

== Points of interest ==
- Kanaha Pond State Wildlife Sanctuary
- Maui Nui Botanical Gardens
- Tasaka Guri-Guri
