= Hawaii Route 31 =

State highway on Maui, Hawaii, US

Hawaii Route 31
- Piʻilani Highway
- Route 31 highlighted in red

Route information
- Maintained by HDOT

Kihei segment
- Length: 7.2 mi (11.6 km)
- North end: Route 310 / Route 311 in Kihei
- South end: Wailea Ike Drive in Wailea

Kaupo segment
- Length: 22.4 mi (36.0 km)
- West end: Route 37 near Kula
- East end: Route 360 in Haleakala Nat'l Park

Location
- Country: United States
- State: Hawaii
- Counties: Maui

Highway system
- Routes in Hawaii
← Route 30	→ Route 32

Hawaii Route 31, also known as the Piʻilani Highway, is a 38-mile road on the island of Maui in Maui County, Hawaii, United States.

== Description ==
The route begins in at an intersection with Hawaii Routes 310 and 311 in the East Maui town of Kihei. The highway formerly ran parallel to the coast all the way to the southern terminus of the Hana Highway (Route 360), until developments in Wailea and Makena blocked access. The Kihei section of the highway now terminates in Wailea, and the much longer Kaupo section, which is mostly a one-lane, winding road, is county-maintained as County Road 31, connects Route 37 near Kula to the Route 360 south of Hana (at the western border of Haleakala National Park).

== Major intersections ==
The entire route is in Maui County.

Location	mi	km	Destinations	Notes
Kihei	0.0	0.0	Route 310 north (Kihei Road) / Route 311 north – Kahului, Airport, Lahaina	Southern termini of Routes 310 and 311
Wailea	7.2	11.6	Wailea Ike Drive west – Wailea, Makena	End state maintenance
Gap in route
	16.0	25.7	Route 37 north (Kula Highway)	Southern terminus of Route 37; begin county maintenance
	25.3	40.7	Begin one-lane roadway	
Kalepa Gulch	38.4	61.8	Kalepa Bridge	
Haleakala National Park	38.4	61.8	Route 360 west (Hana Highway)	Continues east as Route 360
1.000 mi = 1.609 km; 1.000 km = 0.621 mi

== See also ==
- List of state highways in Hawaii
- List of highways numbered 31
