= Hāna Highway =

State highway on Maui, Hawaii, US

Hāna Highway
- Hāna Millennium Legacy Trail
- Hāna Highway highlighted in red

Route information
- Maintained by HDOT
- Length: 64.4 mi (103.6 km)
- Component highways: Route 36 from Kahului to Haiku-Pauwela; Route 360 from Haiku-Pauwela to Hana; Route 31 from Hana to Kalepa Gulch

Major junctions
- West end: Route 32 in Kahului
- East end: Route 31 in Haleakalā Nat'l Park

Location
- Country: United States
- State: Hawaii
- Counties: Maui

Highway system
- Routes in Hawaii
← Route 32B	→ Route 36A
← Route 340	→ Route 361
- Hana Belt Road
- U.S. National Register of Historic Places
- U.S. Historic district
- Hawaiʻi Register of Historic Places
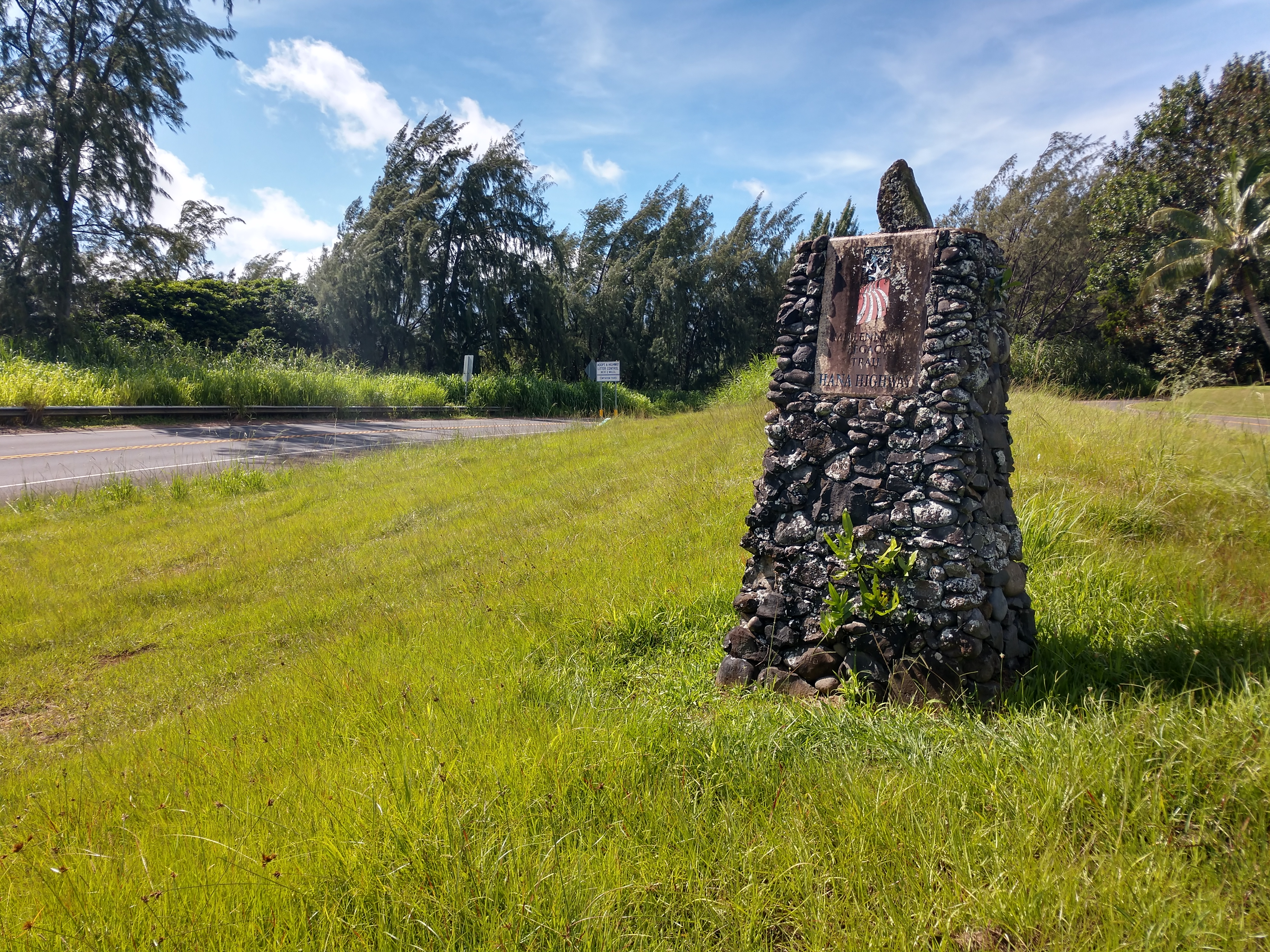
- The Hana Highway Millennium Trail Monument and the Zero Mile Marker (under the Adopt-a-Highway sign) at the Junction of Route 36/360/365.
- Nearest city: Makawao, Hawaii
- Coordinates: 20°53′52″N 156°13′20″W
- Area: 153 acres (62 ha)
- Built: 1900
- Architectural style: Basalt arch, et al.
- NRHP reference No.: 01000615
- HRHP No.: 50-50-va-01638

Significant dates
- Added to NRHP: June 15, 2001
- Designated HRHP: April 20, 2001

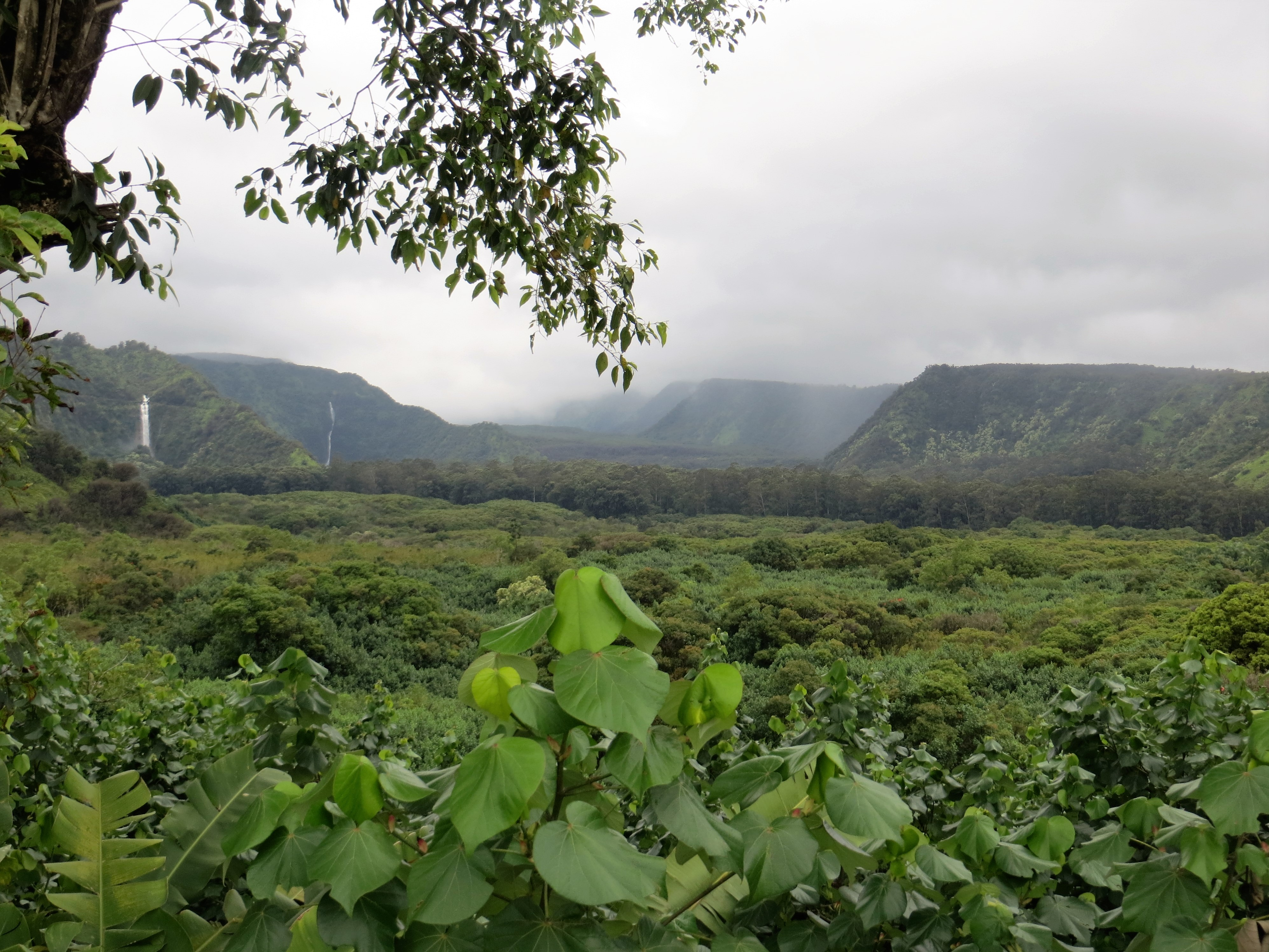
Wailua Valley State Wayside Park along the Road To Hāna.

The Hāna Highway (colloquially referred to as The Road to Hāna) is a 64.4-mile-long (103.6 km) stretch of Hawaii Routes 36 and 360 which connects Kahului to the town of Hana in east Maui. To the east of Kalepa Bridge, the highway continues to Kipahulu as Hawaii Route 31 (the Piilani Highway). Although Hana is only about 52 miles (84 km) from Kahului, an uninterrupted car-trip takes about 2.5 hours to drive, since the highway is very winding, narrow, and passes over 59 bridges, of which 46 are only one lane wide. There are approximately 620 curves along Route 360 from just east of Kahului to Hana, almost all of it through lush, tropical rainforest. Many of the concrete and steel bridges date back to 1910 and all but one are still in use. That one bridge, badly damaged by erosion, was temporarily replaced by a portable steel ACROW or Bailey bridge erected by the United States Army Corps of Engineers until a permanent replacement was built in 2009.

In August 2000, the highway was designated as the Hāna Millennium Legacy Trail by President Bill Clinton, with the trail start designated in Pāʻia. The Hana Highway was listed on the National Register of Historic Places on June 15, 2001.

== Route description ==
Hana Highway consists of Hawaii Routes 36 and 360. Route 36 is a mixture of urban street, divided highway, and high-speed rural highway. Route 360 is a narrow and winding mountain road. Mileposts in tourist guides refer to mile markers on Route 360, not Route 36.

Route 36 begins in Kahului and the junction of Routes 32 and 311, and the road named Hana Highway begins one block east. The highway runs east as a four-lane divided highway, intersecting with Routes 380, 3800 which serve Kahului Airport to the north and connect to Maalaea and West Maui to the south. A short distance east, it intersects Route 37, which serves Haleakala to the south. East of this point, the highway becomes a two-lane rural highway, passing through Pa'ia and Ha'iku. Highway 36 ends at Route 365 east of Haiku, while the Hana Highway continues as Route 360.

Highway 360 is a narrow, winding, and low speed mountain highway. Its initial junction is marked as Mile Zero at Route 36, and the highway runs in a southeasterly direction toward Hana. This highway includes numerous one-lane stretches of roadway, including one-lane bridges. The road provides access to the community of Keanae, Wailua, and Nahiku, arriving at Hana at mile 34. The highway then turns to the west and continues as Route 31.

== Tourism ==
The Hana Highway is a popular tourist attraction in Maui. Guidebooks often devote large sections to traveling the highway leading to the eastern side of Maui, documenting the many waterfalls and attractions that can be found along the way. Although some of these attractions lie within or through private property and will often have "no trespassing" signs posted, guidebooks still describe how to reach them - despite the trespassing and numerous safety concerns.

Beyond the town of Hana, the Hana Highway becomes Maui County Road 31 and leads to the ʻOheʻo Gulch where the Seven Sacred Pools are located within the Kipahulu Area of the Haleakala National Park.

Occasionally the unpaved section of Route 31 is closed to traffic due to landslides.

Scenic turnouts abound, including one for Wailua Falls near the Seven Sacred Pools in Oheʻo.

== History ==
In the sixteenth century, Maui's King Pi'ilani conquered East Maui and drew Hana into his political sphere. Pi'ilani built the Alaloa, the "long road," from West Maui, a road on which travelers reportedly swung themselves over East Maui's rushing streams with ropes made of vines. Later, Piilani's son, Kihapiilani, extended the Alaloa into the Hana District. When completed, the road was 4 to 6 feet (1.2 to 1.8 m) wide, 138 miles (222 km), and paved with hand-fitted basalt (lava) rocks. Modern road construction to Hana began in the 1870s, with an unpaved road built to facilitate the construction of the Hämäkua Ditch. Part of The East Maui Irrigation System, the Hämäkua Ditch brought water from the rainforests of Haleakalā to semi-arid central Maui to support the sugarcane industry.

Road construction continued in the early 1900s and was extended piecemeal until the full road to Hana was officially opened on December 18, 1926. Construction of bridges continued through the 1930s and the road was not completely paved until the 1960s.

== Major intersections ==
The entire route is in Maui County.

Location	mi	km	Destinations	Notes
Kahului	0.0	0.0	Route 32 (Kaahumanu Avenue)	Northern terminus of Route 36, western terminus of Hana Highway
Kahului	0.2	0.32	Route 32A north (Hobron Avenue)	No southbound access, southern terminus of Route 32A
Kahului	0.6	0.97	Route 36A east (Haleakala Highway)	Western terminus of Route 36A
Kahului	0.9	1.4	Route 380 (Dairy Road) – Kihei, Lahaina	
Kahului	1.2	1.9	Route 3800 (Airport Access Road) – Airport, Kihei, Lahaina	
Kahului	2.9	4.7	Route 37 (Haleakala Highway) – Pukalani, Makawao, Kula, Haleakala Crater	
Paia	6.7	10.8	Baldwin Avenue – Makawao	
	16.2	26.1	Route 365 south (Kaupakalua Road); Route 36 / Route 360	Northern terminus of Route 365; Eastern terminus of Route 36, western terminus of Route 360
Keanae	32.8	52.8	Keanae Road – Keanae	
Hana	47.6	76.6	Alalele Road – Hana Airport	
Hana	48.1	77.4	Honokalani Road – Waianapanapa State Park	
Hana	49.9	80.3	Uakea Road – Hana Bay	
Hana	50.6	81.4	Keawa Place – Hana Bay	Former terminus of state maintenance
Hamoa Beach	52.4	84.3	Haneoo Road – Hamoa Beach, Koki Beach	
Haleakala National Park	60.7	97.7	Haleakala National Park – Kipahulu Area	Access to Oheʻo Gulch (Seven Sacred Pools)
Kalepa Gulch	64.4	103.6	Kalepa Bridge	
Kalepa Gulch	64.4	103.6	Route 31 west (Piilani Highway)	Eastern terminus of Route 360 and the Hana Highway
1.000 mi = 1.609 km; 1.000 km = 0.621 mi: Incomplete access; Route transition

== Gallery ==
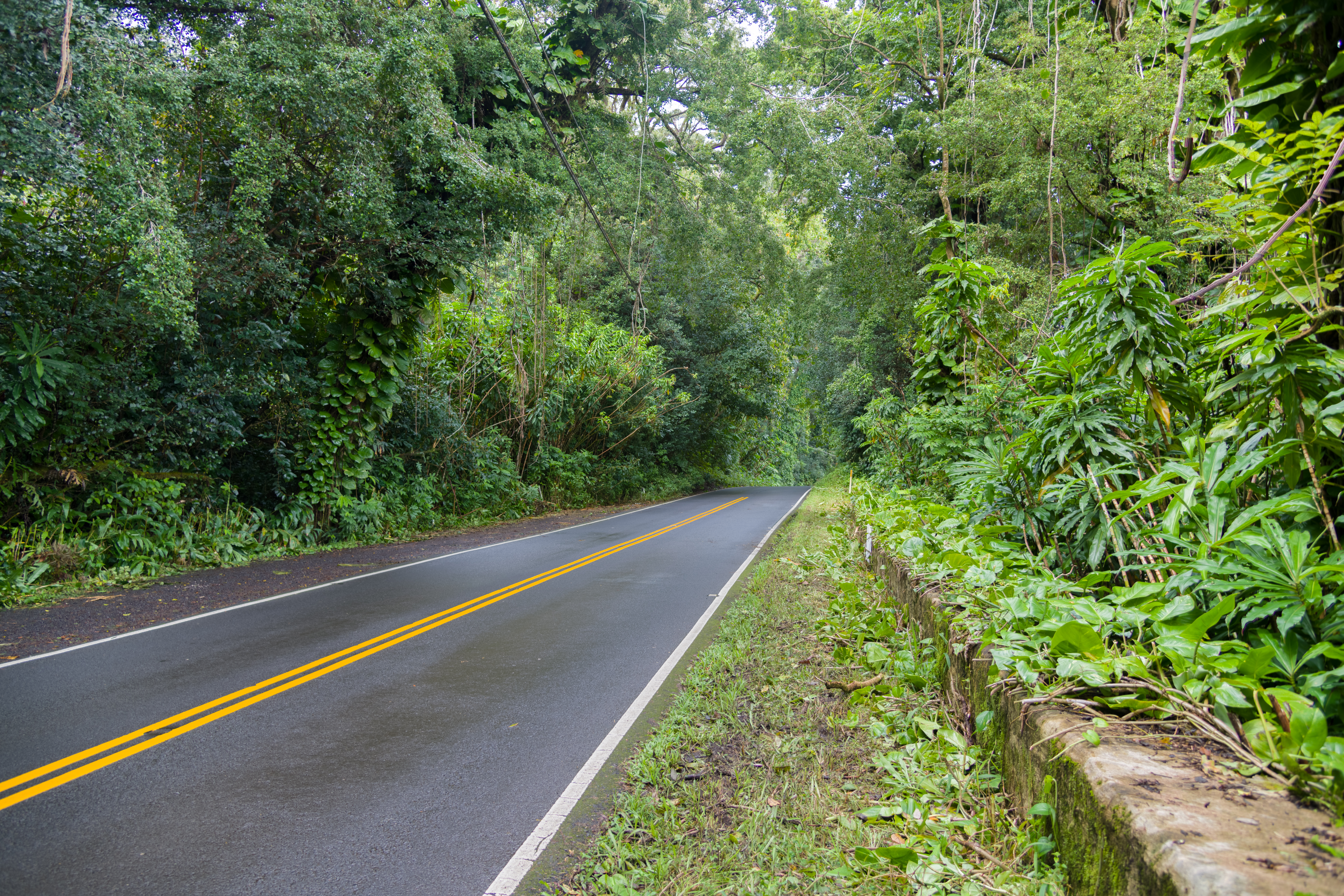
Section of highway between Nahiku and Waianapanapa State Park

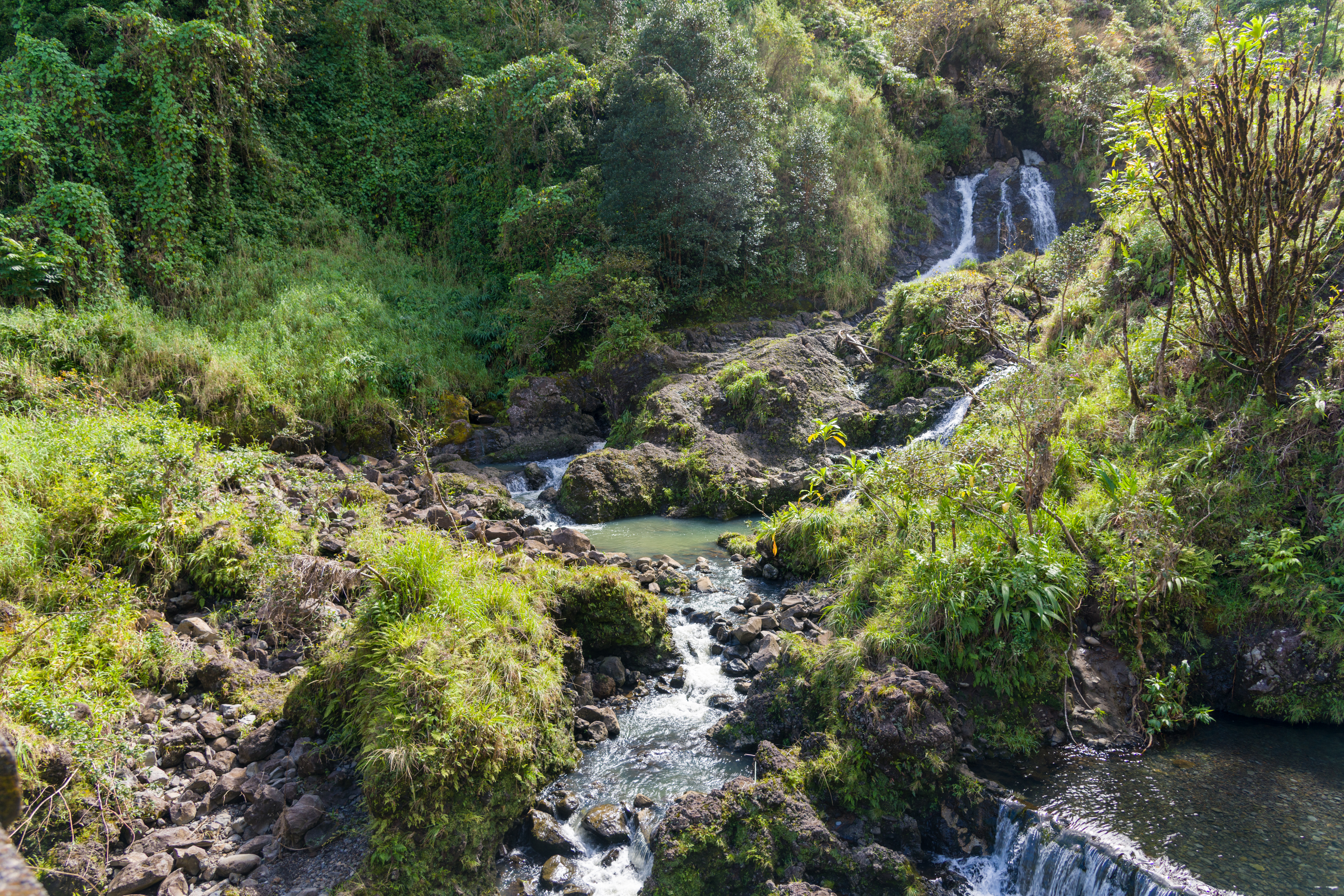
Waterfalls adjacent to Hana Highway

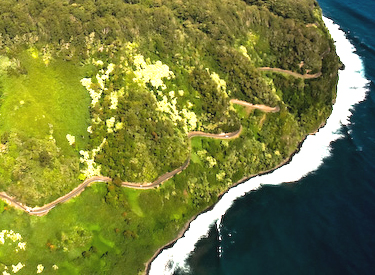
Aerial view of highway

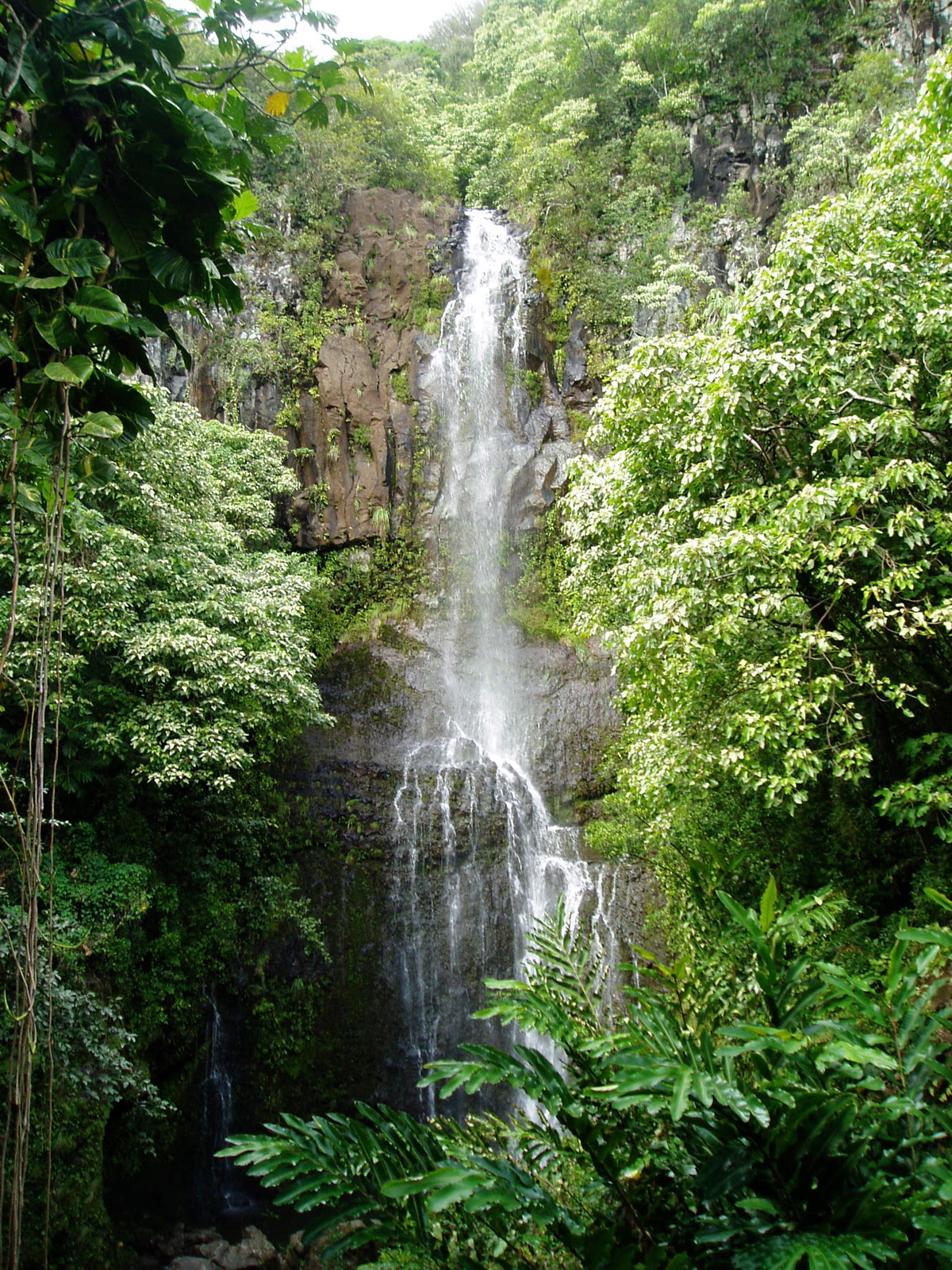
Wailua Falls

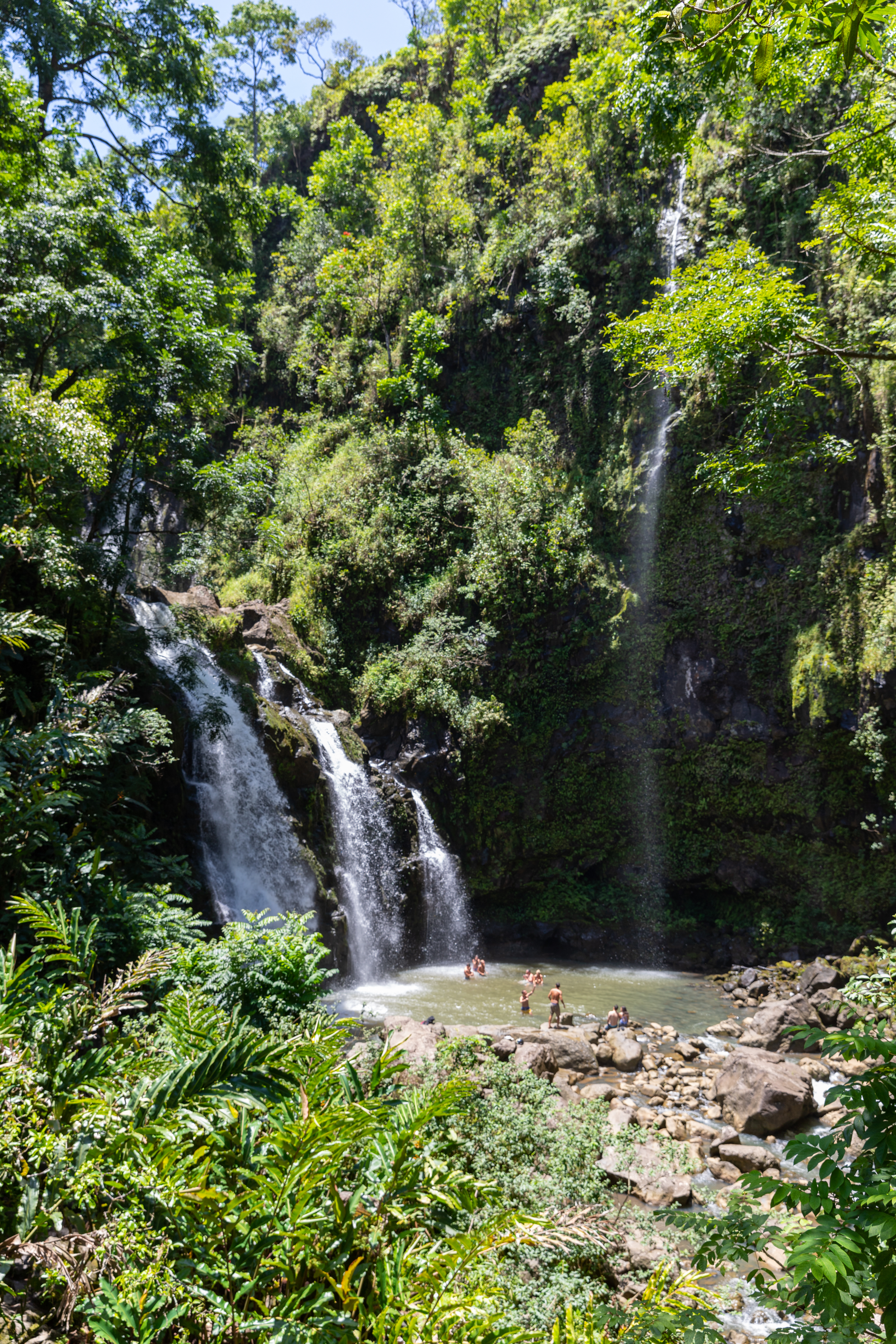
Upper Waikani Falls Maui Hawaii

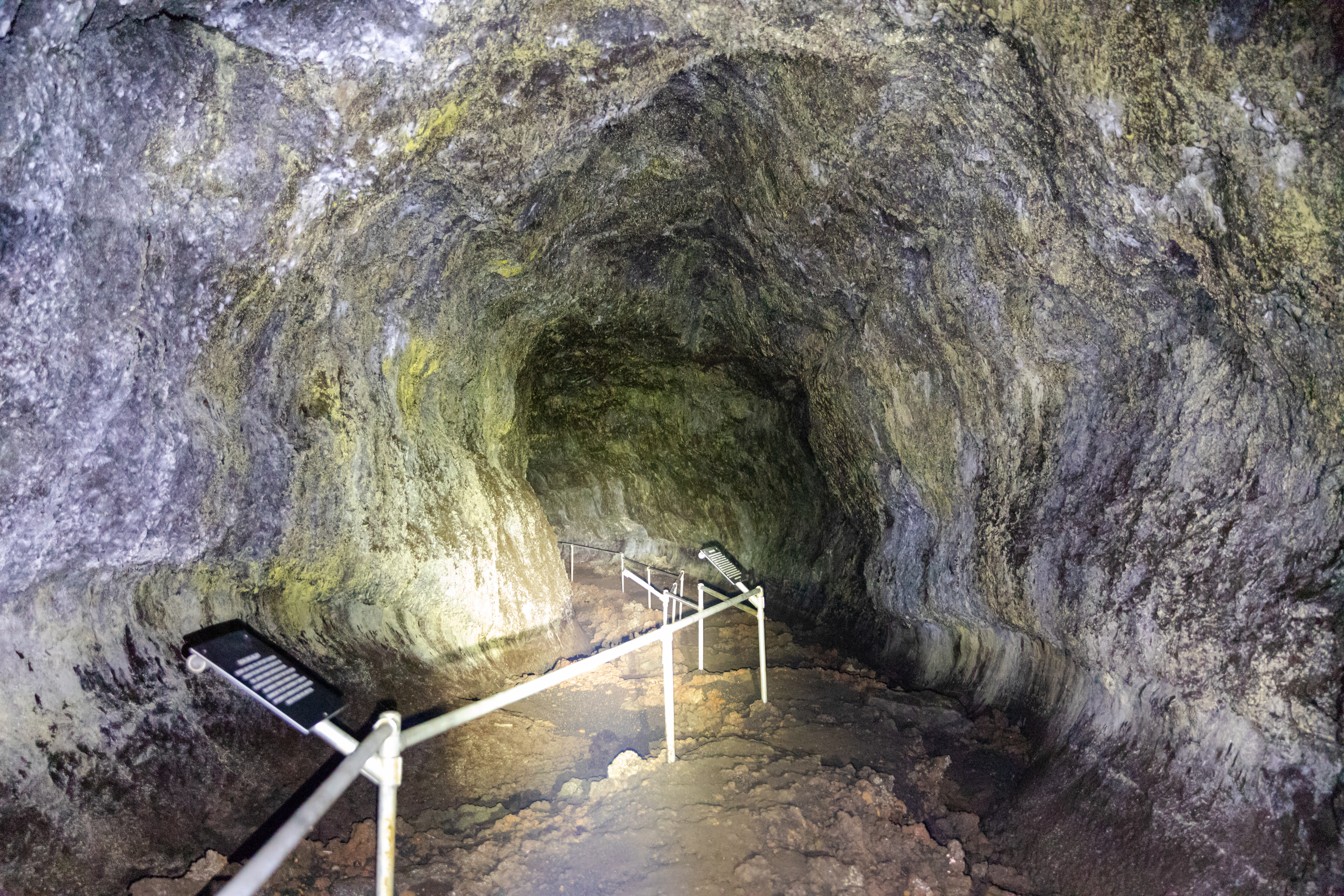
Hana Lava tube Maui, Hawaii

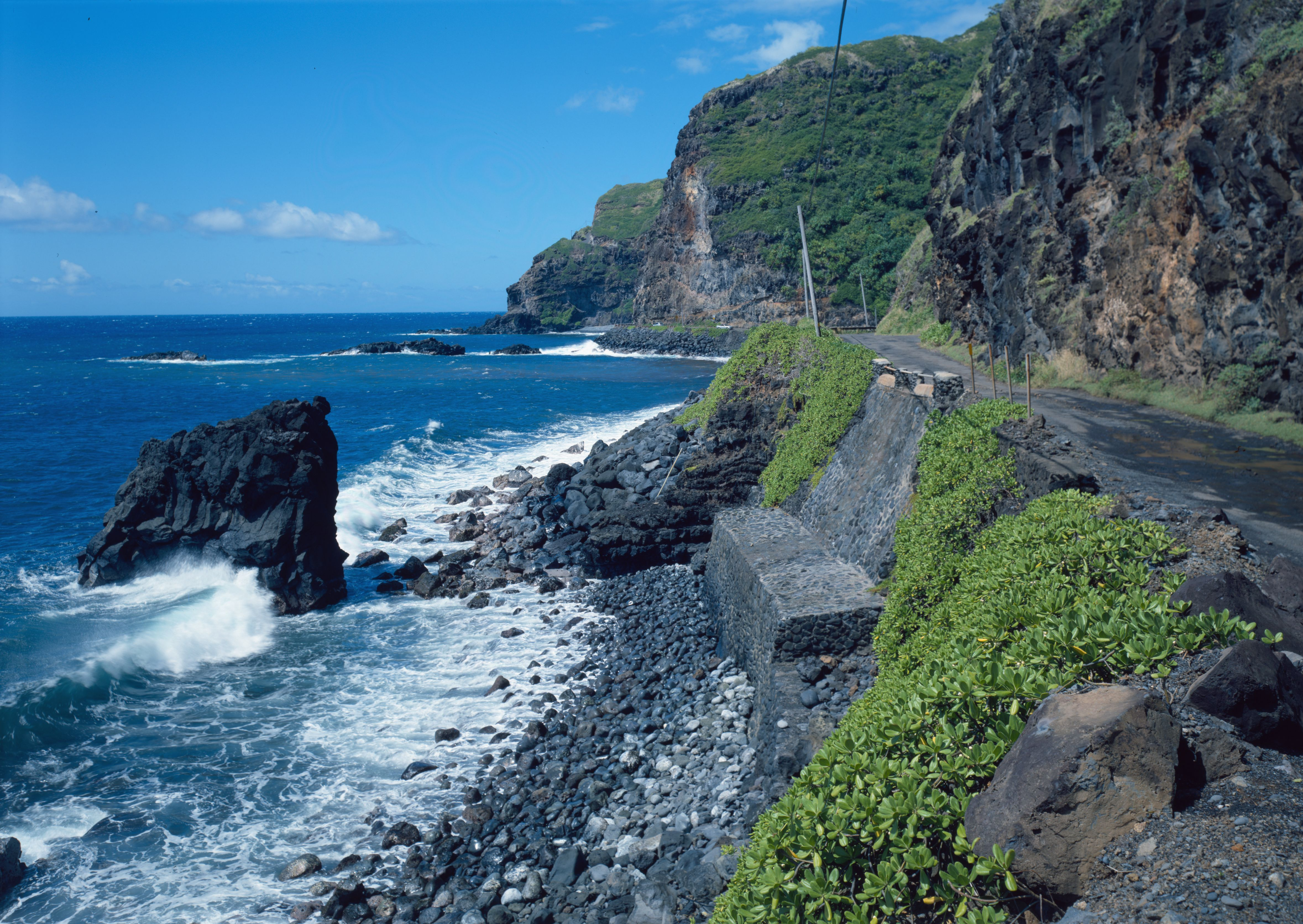
Highway between Haiku and Kaipahulu

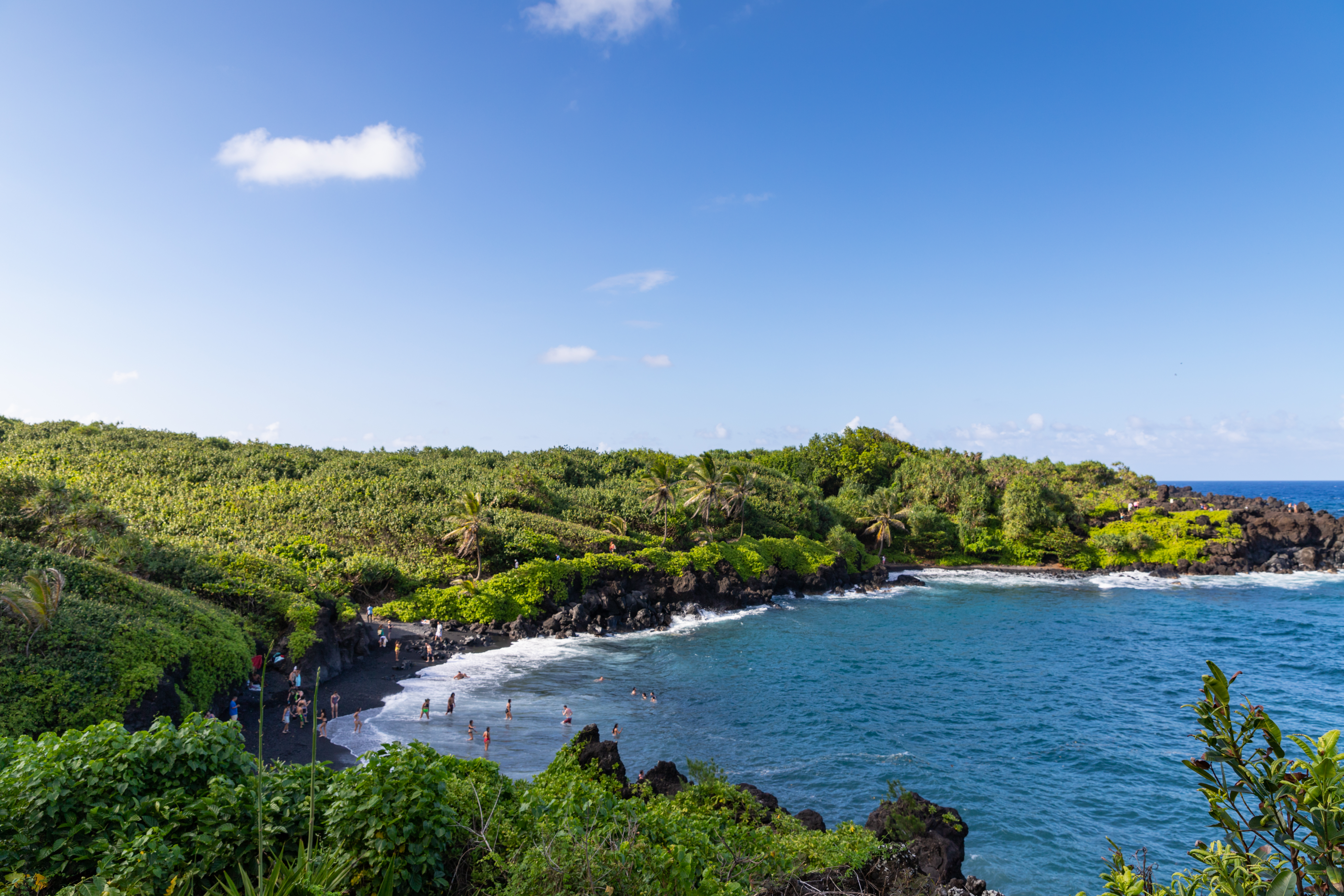
Waianapanapa black sand beach next to Hana

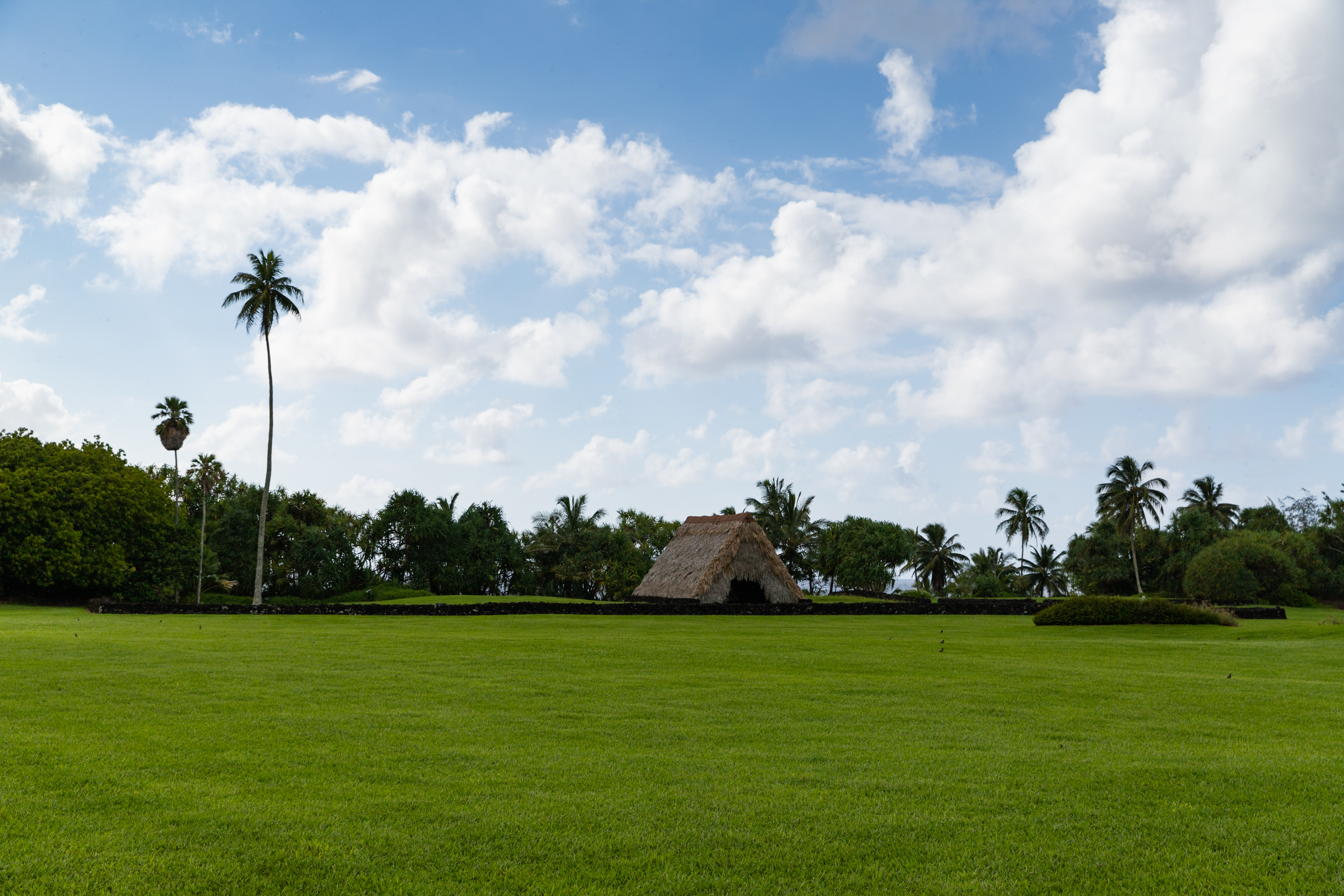
Kahanu garden old house Maui, Road to Hana

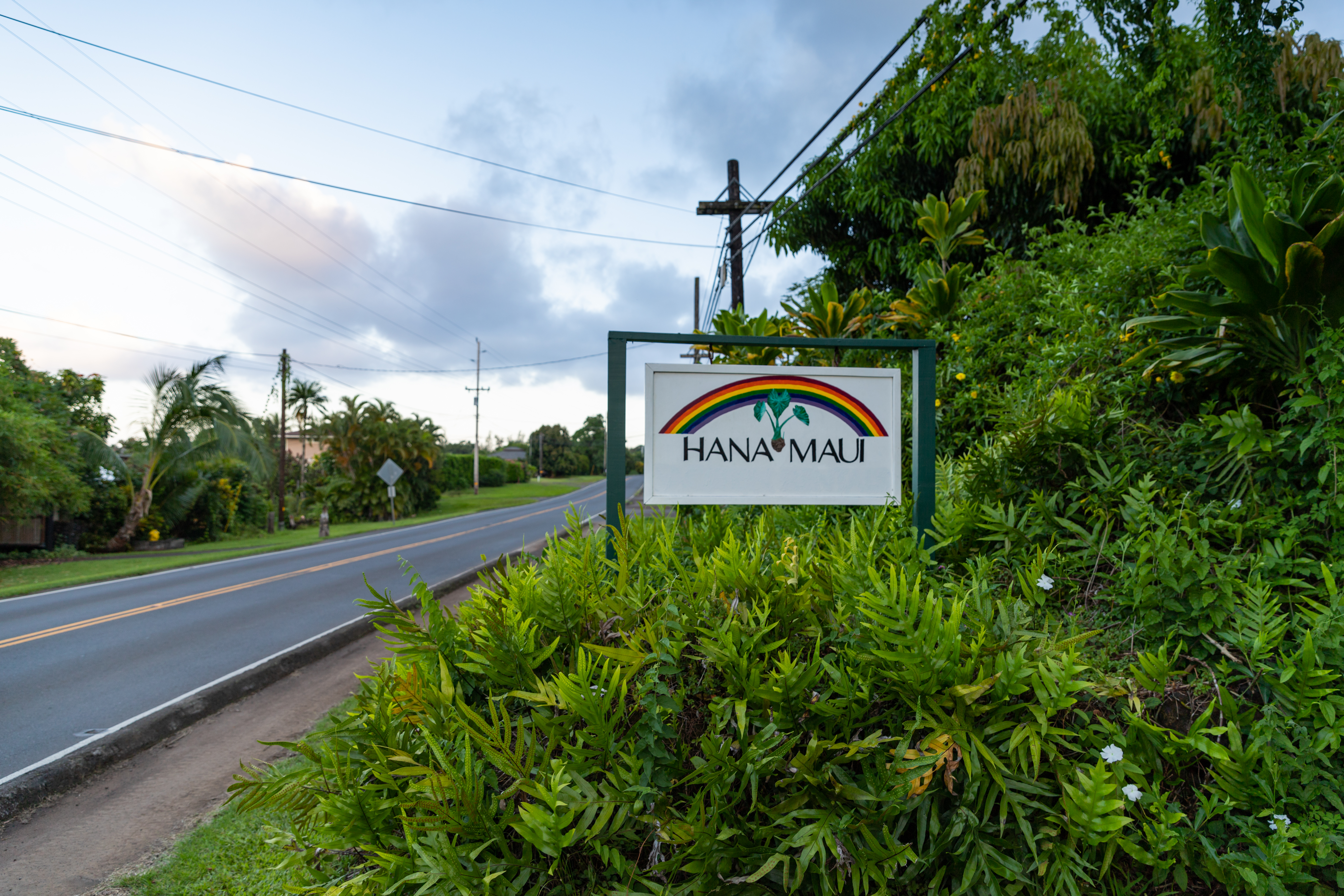
Hana, Maui

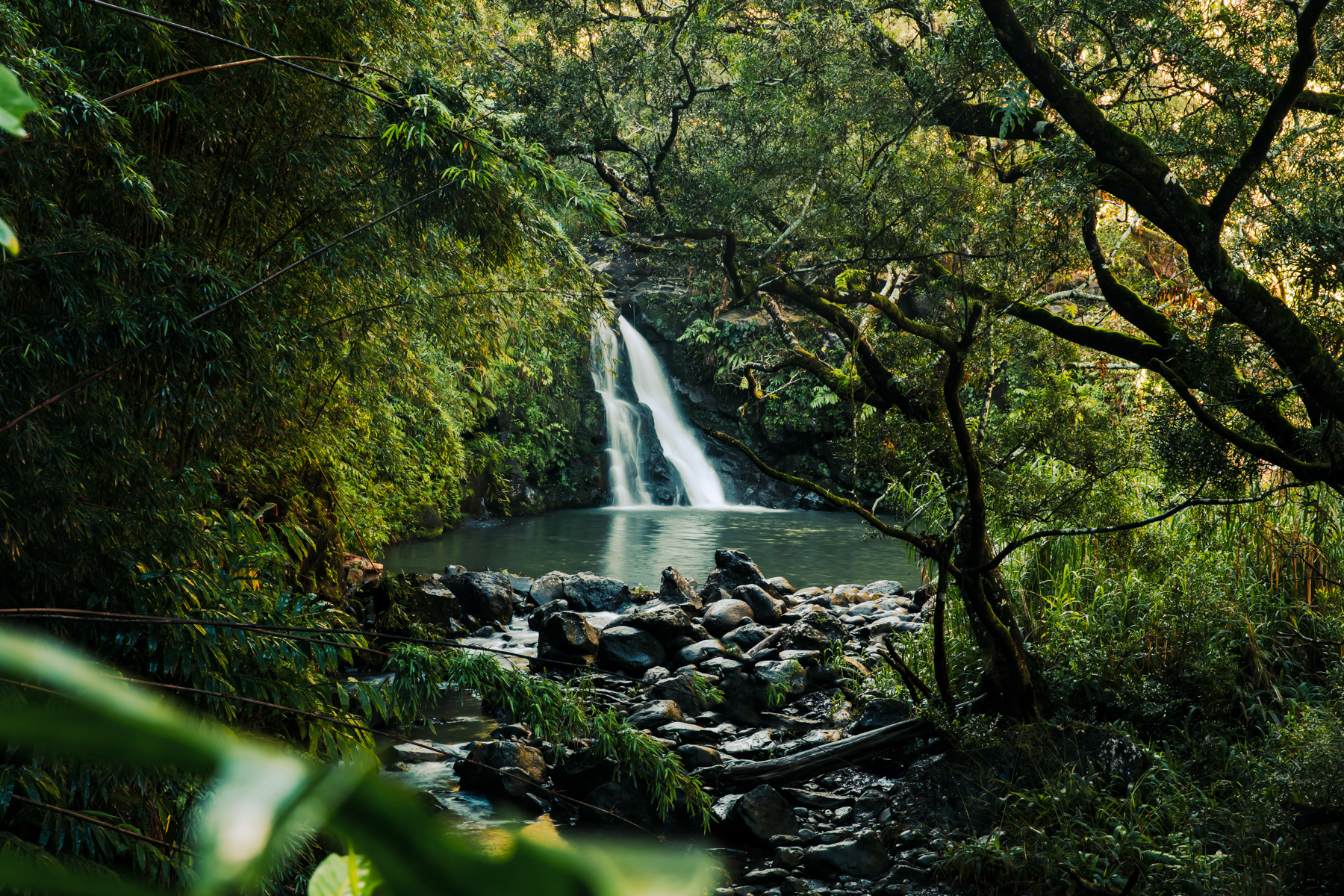
Haipua'ena Falls, located along the famed Road to Hana

== See also ==
- List of bridges documented by the Historic American Engineering Record in Hawaii

Browse numbered routes
← Route 32B	→ Route 36A
← Route 340	→ Route 361
