= Hawaii Route 37 =

State highway on Maui, Hawaii, US

Hawaii Route 37
- Route 37 highlighted in red

Route information
- Maintained by HDOT
- Length: 24.1 mi (38.8 km)

Major junctions
- South end: Route 31 near Kula
- North end: Route 36 in Kahului

Location
- Country: United States
- State: Hawaii
- Counties: Maui

Highway system
- Routes in Hawaii
← Route 36	→ Route 44

Hawaii Route 37 is a 24.1-mile (38.79 km) road on the island of Maui in Maui County, Hawaii, United States.

== Route description ==
Route 37's northern terminus is with Route 36, where it heads eastward as Haleakala Highway. At the junction with Route 377, it becomes the Kula Highway, until its southern terminus with Route 31. A short 1.6 mile section of the Kula Highway between Thompson and Kamaole Roads is also called Ulupalakua Road.

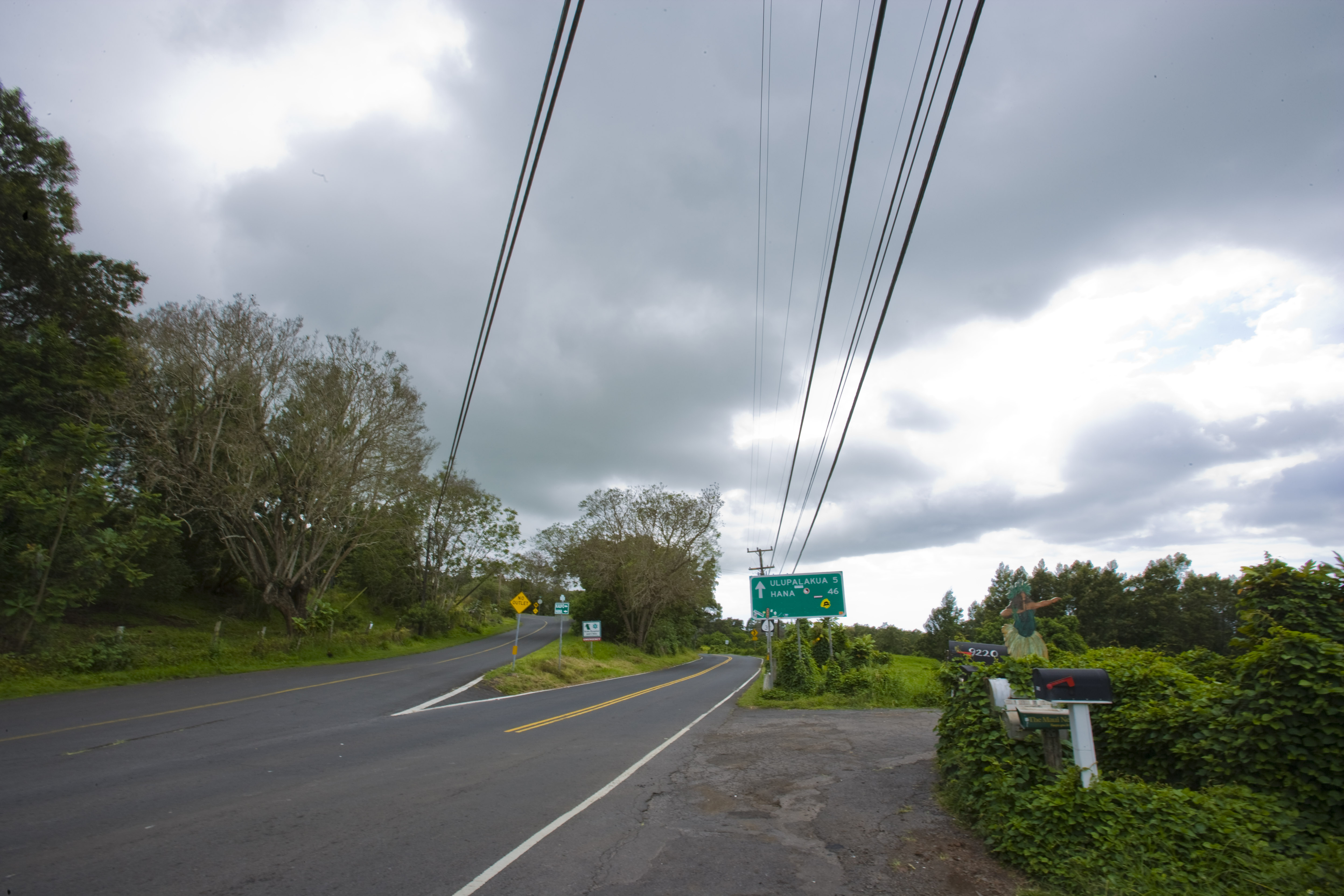
Turn off along Route 37, May 2006

== Major intersections ==
The entire route is in Maui County.

Location	mi	km	Destinations	Notes
	0.0	0.0	Route 31 east (Pilani Highway)	Road continues east as Route 31
Kula	9.8	15.8	Route 377 north (Kekaulike Avenue) – Haleakala Crater	Southern terminus of Route 377
Pukalani	16.3	26.2	Route 377 south (Haleakala Highway) – Haleakala	Northern terminus of Route 377
Pukalani	16.9	27.2	Route 365 (Makawao Avenue) – Pukalani, Makawao	
Kahului	24.1	38.8	Route 36 (Hana Highway) – Kahului, Wailuku, Paia, Hana	
1.000 mi = 1.609 km; 1.000 km = 0.621 mi

== See also ==
- List of state highways in Hawaii
- List of highways numbered 37
