= Fagan's Cross =

Statue in Hawaii

- Location: Lyon Hill, Hana, Hawaii
- Coordinates: 20.7536°N 155.9948°W
- Type: Memorial cross
- Material: Volcanic rock
- Completion date: 1960
- Dedicated to: Paul Fagan

Fagan's Cross is a large stone cross on Lyon Hill in Hana, Hawaii. Created in 1960, it is 545 ft (166 m) above sea level and made from volcanic rock. It is a common stop for people passing by the area on the Hana Highway.

== History ==
The cross was created in 1960 in memory of San Francisco-native Paul Irving Fagan, Sr., who, before dying in 1960, established cattle farming in Hana, where the cross is located. Fagan also built the town's main hotel, Travaasa Hana, now owned by Hyatt, in 1946. Fagan was not buried near the cross; he was interred at Cypress Lawn Memorial Park in California.

== Features ==
Residents of Hana gather before sunrise at the cross on Easter Sunday to perform mass during the sunrise. The cross can be accessed through a 1.5 mi (2.4 km) round trip hike with 500 ft (150 m) elevation gain. The trailhead is located across from the Travaasa Hana hotel. In addition to the cross, the trail also leads to a panoramic viewpoint of Maui's eastern coast. The grounds around the cross have an ant infestation.
