= List of bridges documented by the Historic American Engineering Record in Hawaii =

This is a list of bridges documented by the Historic American Engineering Record in the U.S. state of Hawaii.

== Bridges ==
Survey No.	Name (as assigned by HAER)	Status	Type	Built	Documented	Carries	Crosses	Location	County	Coordinates
HI-4	Wailoa Bridge	Replaced	Reinforced concrete girder	1938	1983	Route 19 (Kamehameha Avenue)	Wailoa River	Hilo	Hawaiʻi	19°43′21″N 155°04′13″W
HI-34	Papaahawahawa Bridge	Replaced	Reinforced concrete girder	1913	1996	Route 360 (Piʻilani Highway)	Papaahawahawa Gulch	Kipahulu	Maui	20°41′14″N 156°00′40″W
HI-41	ʻAuwaiakeakua Bridge	Replaced	Timber stringer	1940	1997	Route 190 (Māmalahoa Highway)	ʻAuwaiakekua Gulch	Waikoloa Village	Hawaiʻi	19°52′31″N 155°43′21″W
HI-63	Paihi Bridge	Replaced	Reinforced concrete girder	1911	2002	Route 360 (Hāna Highway)	Paihi Gulch	Kipahulu	Maui	20°41′03″N 156°01′44″W
HI-70	Kaukauʻai Bridge	Replaced	Reinforced concrete open-spandrel arch	1941	2002	Route 360 (Hāna Highway)	Kaukauʻai Gulch	Kipahulu	Maui	20°39′04″N 156°03′38″W
HI-71	Waiohonu Bridge	Replaced	Reinforced concrete girder	1915	2003	Route 360 (Hāna Highway)	Waiohonu Stream	Puʻuiki	Maui	20°42′19″N 155°59′47″W
HI-72	Kapiʻa Stream Bridge	Replaced	Reinforced concrete girder	1915	2002	Route 360 (Hāna Highway)	Kapiʻa Stream	Hāna	Maui	20°42′47″N 155°59′34″W
HI-74	Lihuʻe Mill Bridge	Replaced	Steel rolled stringer	1936	2004	Route 50 (Kaumauliʻi Highway)	Hoʻomana Road	Līhuʻe	Kauaʻi	21°58′32″N 159°22′24″W
HI-81-C	Schofield Barracks Military Reservation, Ku Tree Reservoir, Valve Tower Foot Bridge	Demolished	Suspension	1925	2008		Kalakoa Stream	Wahiawa	Honolulu	
HI-90	Makaha Bridges 3 & 3A	Replaced	Timber stringer	1937	2009	Route 93 (Farrington Highway)	Makaha Stream	Honolulu	Honolulu	21°28′38″N 158°13′12″W
HI-91	Oahu Railway and Land Company Trestle Ruins	Demolished	Trestle	1897	2009	Oahu Railway and Land Company	Makaha Stream	Honolulu	Honolulu	21°28′38″N 158°13′12″W
HI-94	Kawailii Bridge	Replaced	Reinforced concrete girder	1938	2010	Route 19 (Hawaii Belt Road)	Kawailii Gulch	Paauilo	Hawaiʻi	20°02′07″N 155°21′33″W
HI-98	Haneoo Bridge	Replaced	Reinforced concrete cast-in-place slab	1900	2012	Route 360 (Piʻilani Highway)	Haneoo Stream	Hāna	Maui	20°43′48″N 155°59′35″W
HI-99	Honouliuli Bridge	Extant	Reinforced concrete T-beam	1939	2012	Route 7110 (Farrington Highway)	Honouliuli Stream	ʻEwa Beach	Honolulu	21°22′27″N 158°02′00″W
HI-100	Waikele Canal Bridge and Highway Overpass	Extant	Reinforced concrete T-beam	1939	2012	Route 7101 (Farrington Highway) eastbound	Waikele Canal and Oahu Railway and Land Company	Waipahu	Honolulu	21°22′59″N 158°00′38″W
HI-101	Waiawa Bridge	Extant	Reinforced concrete T-beam	1933	2012	Route 99 (Kamehameha Highway) westbound	Waiawa Stream	Pearl City	Honolulu	21°23′47″N 157°58′48″W
HI-115	Waimalu Bridge	Extant	Reinforced concrete girder	1936	2012	Route 99 (Kamehameha Highway)	Waimalu Stream	Pearl City	Honolulu	21°23′10″N 157°57′09″W
HI-116	Kalauao Springs Bridge	Extant	Reinforced concrete girder	1936	2012	Route 99 (Kamehameha Highway)	Kalauao Springs	Aiea	Honolulu	21°22′55″N 157°56′36″W
HI-117	Kalauao Stream Bridge	Extant	Reinforced concrete girder	1936	2012	Route 99 (Kamehameha Highway)	Kalauao Stream	Aiea	Honolulu	21°22′50″N 157°56′25″W
HI-121	Kalialinui Bridge	Replaced	Reinforced concrete cast-in-place slab	1925	2014	Hansen Road	Kalialinui Stream	Kahului	Maui	20°52′41″N 156°25′56″W
HI-124	Waipilopilo Bridge	Extant	Reinforced concrete girder	1932	2015	Route 83 (Kamehameha Highway)	Waipilopilo Stream	Hauʻula	Honolulu	21°36′54″N 157°54′48″W
HI-125	Kapalama Canal Bridge	Extant	Reinforced concrete T-beam	1930	2012	Dillingham Boulevard	Kapālama Drainage Canal	Honolulu	Honolulu	21°19′19″N 157°52′24″W
HI-126	Queen Street Bridge	Extant	Reinforced concrete T-beam	1932	2012	Route 92 (Nimitz Highway) westbound	Nuuana Stream	Honolulu	Honolulu	21°18′48″N 157°51′55″W
HI-127	Hoomana Overpass	Extant	Reinforced concrete cast-in-place slab	1928	2012	Hoomana Road	Līhuʻe Plantation Company railroad	Līhuʻe	Kauaʻi	21°58′33″N 159°22′25″W
HI-128	Lihue Plantation Railroad Bridge	Extant	Reinforced concrete girder	1928	2012	Līhuʻe Plantation railroad	Nawiliwili Stream	Līhuʻe	Kauaʻi	21°58′33″N 159°22′26″W
HI-130	Kipapa Bridge	Extant	Reinforced concrete T-beam	1933	2016	Route 99 (Kamehameha Highway)	Kipapa Gulch	Mililani Town	Honolulu	21°25′37″N 158°00′41″W
HI-131	Ninole Bridge	Extant	Timber stringer	1940	2016	Route 11 (Māmalahoa Highway)	Nīnole Stream	Pahala	Hawaiʻi	19°08′19″N 155°31′02″W
HI-132	Hilea Bridge	Extant	Timber stringer	1940	2016	Route 11 (Māmalahoa Highway)	Hilea Stream	Pahala	Hawaiʻi	19°07′29″N 155°31′33″W
HI-137	Hanapepe Bridge	Extant	Reinforced concrete T-beam	1938	2016	Route 50 (Kaumualiʻi Highway)	Hanapēpē River	Hanapēpē	Kauaʻi	21°54′32″N 159°35′27″W
HI-140	Laieloa Stream Bridge	Extant	Reinforced concrete T-beam	1932	2015	Route 83 (Kamehameha Highway)	Laieloa Stream	Laie	Honolulu	21°38′52″N 157°55′22″W
HI-141	Waipa Stream Bridge	Extant	Reinforced concrete T-beam	1912	2018	Route 560 (Kuhio Highway)	Waipa Stream	Hanalei	Kauaʻi	22°12′14″N 159°30′51″W
HI-142	Waikoko Stream Bridge	Extant	Reinforced concrete girder	1913	2018	Route 560 (Kuhio Highway)	Waikoko Stream	Hanalei	Kauaʻi	22°12′14″N 159°30′51″W
