= Hawaii Route 377 =

State highway on Maui, Hawaii, US

Hawaii Route 377
- Route 377 highlighted in red

Route information
- Maintained by HDOT
- Length: 9.2 mi (14.8 km)

Major junctions
- South end: Route 37
- North end: Route 37

Location
- Country: United States
- State: Hawaii

Highway system
- Routes in Hawaii
← Route 374	→ Route 378

Route 377 is a 9.2-mile-long (14.8 km) road on the island of Maui in Hawaii. The route starts and ends at Route 37, and is signed Haleakalā Highway for the northernmost six miles (9.7 km), and Kekaulike Avenue for the rest, as the Haleakalā highway continues on Hawaii Route 378.

== Major intersections ==
The entire route is in Maui County.

Location	mi	km	Destinations	Notes
	0.0	0.0	Route 37 (Kula Highway) – Keokea	Southern terminus
	9.2	14.8	Route 37 (Kula Highway) – Pukalani	Northern terminus
1.000 mi = 1.609 km; 1.000 km = 0.621 mi

== See also ==
- List of state highways in Hawaii
