= Maui Veterans Highway =

State highway on Maui, Hawaii, US

Hawaii Route 311
- Maui Veterans Highway
- Route 311 highlighted in red

Route information
- Maintained by HDOT
- Length: 6.405 mi (10.308 km)

Major junctions
- South end: Route 31 / Route 310 in Kihei
- North end: Route 380 in Kahului

Location
- Country: United States
- State: Hawaii
- Counties: Maui

Highway system
- Routes in Hawaii
← Route 310	→ Route 320

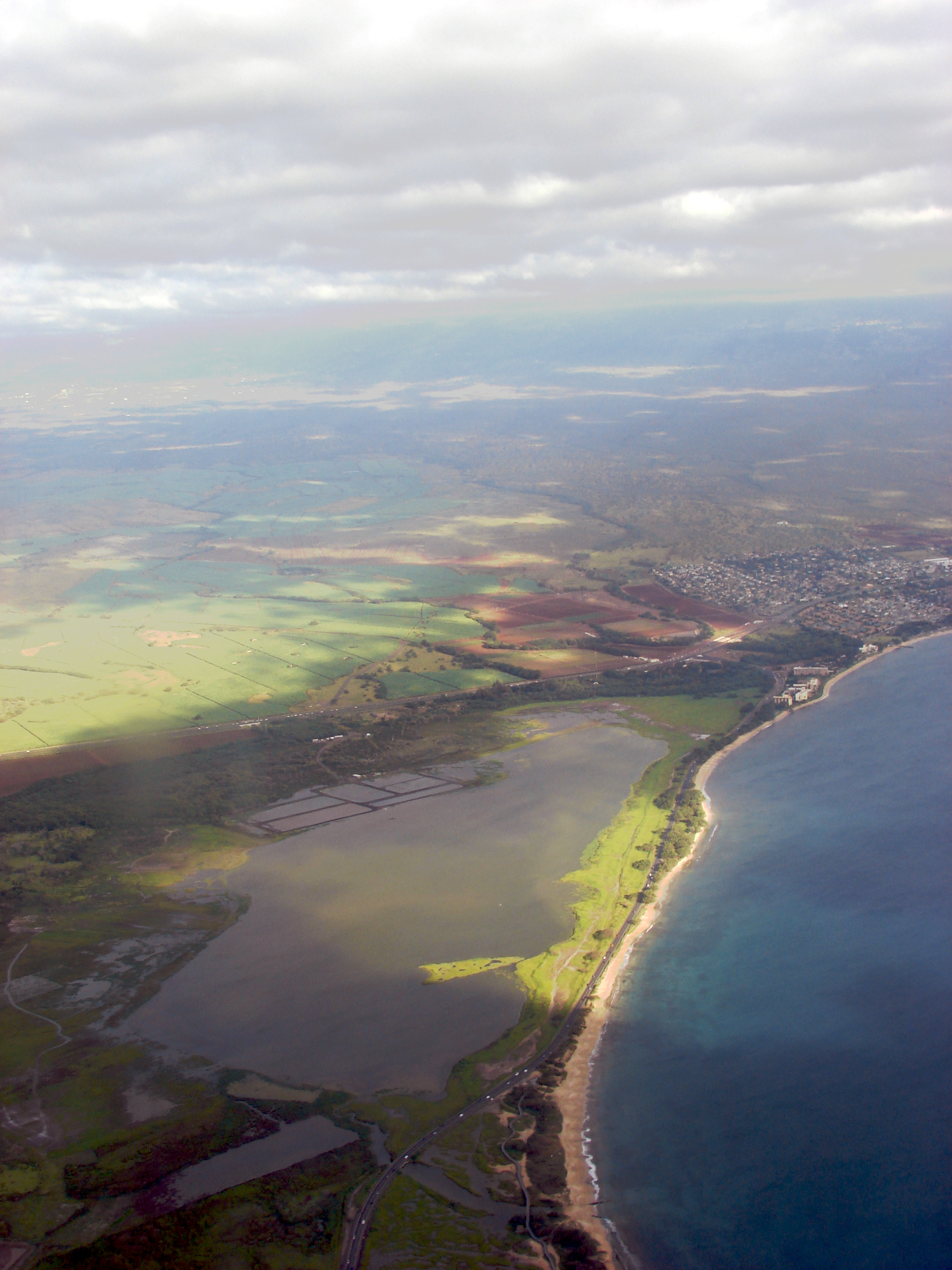
Maui Veterans Highway shown just above Kealia Pond National Wildlife Refuge as it enters Kihei

Maui Veterans Highway or Route 311 (formerly Mokulele Highway) is a highway on the island of Maui in Hawaii that runs south through the isthmus of Maui from the town of Kahului and nearby Kahului Airport, Maui's international airport, to Kihei, a distance of approximately 7 miles (11 km). Most of the highway passes through sugarcane fields. Its name was changed from Mokulele Highway to the current name in April 2017 when Governor David Ige signed a bill passed by both houses of the Legislature without opposition.

== Route description ==
The highway begins as a continuation of Puunene Road South leaving Kahului, then passes through what is known as the "Puunene" area of Maui as Route 311 and 350 combined. It continues south through agricultural land and intersects the Piilani Highway as it nears the Kealia Pond National Wildlife Refuge, ending shortly after at its junction with South Kihei Road on the north side of Kihei.

== Major intersections ==
The entire route is in Maui County.

Location	mi	km	Destinations	Notes
Kihei	0.000	0.000	Route 31 south (Piilani Highway) / Route 310 north (Kihei Road) – Wailea, Makena, Lahaina	Termini of Routes 31 and 310
Kahului	6.405	10.308	Route 380 (Dairy Road) / Puunene Avenue north – Kahului, Lahaina, Airport	Continues north without designation
1.000 mi = 1.609 km; 1.000 km = 0.621 mi

== See also ==
- List of state highways in Hawaii
- List of highways numbered 311
