= Hawaii Harbor Police =

American maritime law enforcement agency

Hawaii Department of Transportation Harbor Police
- HP officer badge, with random badge number.
- Common name: Harbor Police
- Abbreviation: HP

Agency overview
- Employees: 19
- Volunteers: 0

Jurisdictional structure
- Operations jurisdiction: Hawaii, United States
- Legal jurisdiction: Hawaii
- General nature: Civilian police

Operational structure
- Headquarters: Honolulu, Hawaii
- Harbor Enforcement Officers: 20, 19 on Oahu and 1 on Maui
- Agency executive: Vacant, Harbor Police Chief
- Parent agency: Hawaii Department of Transportation

Facilities
- Boats: 2
- Personal Water Crafts: 2

The Hawaii Department of Transportation Harbor Police) was the principal maritime law enforcement agency of the State of Hawaii, headquartered at Honolulu Harbor. In 2024, the agency dissolved and its functions, staff, and equipment were merged into the Hawaii Department of Law Enforcement.

== History ==
Little is known about law enforcement at commercial ports in Hawaii prior to 1967. Law enforcement authority, and the authorization to appoint police officers was granted to the Director of Transportation on May 15, 1967, but has switched from state agency to agency until explicitly re-delegated to the Department of Transportation in 1996.

On July 2, 1987, police officers appointed by the Director of Transportation were granted additional authority to enforce certain conservation, resources, and historic preservation laws under the jurisdiction of the Department of Land and Natural Resources (DLNR). Upon request by the Department of Transportation, Conservation and Resources Enforcement Officers appointed by the DLNR were authorized to enforce rules relating to public beaches and ocean waters, and those relating to the operation of vessels in state waters.

On June 7, 1989, Governor John D. Waiheʻe III signed Act 211 (1989) into law, which consolidated state law enforcement entities into a single state Department of Public Safety.

On July 1, 1991, Marine Patrol officers under the jurisdiction of the Department of Transportation were transferred to the Department of Public Safety, with the primary responsibility to enforce boating, ocean recreational and coastal area programs.

Effective July 1, 1992, police officers appointed by the Director of Transportation could focus on protecting commercial harbors in the state as the bulk of their primary responsibilities were transferred to other state agencies. Furthermore, the Department of Transportation no longer had jurisdiction over small boat harbors, including public beaches and ocean waters.

After five years with the Department of Public Safety, the functions of the Marine Patrol were transferred to the Department of Land and Natural Resources to focus on ocean recreation and coastal area enforcement on July 1, 1996. The Harbor Patrol, established by the Department of Public Safety, was transferred to the Department of Transportation to focus on law enforcement at commercial harbors on the same date.

On July 2, 2019, Harbor police officers were authorized to utilize electric guns while performing their duties.

=== Proposed law enforcement mergers ===
In August 2017, HDOT indicated that it was planning on merging Hawaii Harbor Police and Hawaii State Sheriff deputies assigned to the Daniel K. Inouye International Airport into a single law enforcement agency controlled by the department. In January 2018, House Bill No. 2402 and Senate Bill No. 2829 were introduced by the respective presiding officers of each chamber of the Hawaii State Legislature on behalf of the Governor of Hawaii. The bills are identical companion measures which would have created an "Office of Law Enforcement and Security for Transportation Systems" in HDOT. As of April 2018, the bills have not been scheduled for any legislative hearings, have failed to meet internal legislative deadlines, and are unlikely to become law.

Senate Bill No. 2909, also introduced in January 2018, initially proposed to consolidate and place Hawaii Harbor Police, the Hawaii State Sheriff, the Hawaii Department of Public Safety's Narcotics Enforcement Division, and the Hawaii Division of Conservation and Resource Enforcement under the jurisdiction of the Hawaii Department of the Attorney General. On July 5, 2018, Governor David Ige signed the bill into law as Act 124, Session Laws of Hawaii 2018, which required the Hawaii Legislative Reference Bureau "to conduct a study that examines consolidating the law enforcement activities and responsibilities of various state divisions and agencies under a single, centralized state enforcement division or agency".

In January 2019, the Legislative Reference Bureau released Report No. 1, 2019 - "Joining Forces? Potential Consolidation of State Law Enforcement Duties in Hawaii". The bureau determined that due to the "lack of clearly defined goals of a consolidation, it is not clear that a consolidation would be either desirable or beneficial."

In January 2024, the Harbor Police was subsumed by the State Sheriff Division as part of a law to consolidate state-level law enforcement functions under the newly created established Hawaii Department of Law Enforcement.

== Boats ==
The Harbor Police maintained and operated a 27-foot, aluminum-hull vessel christened Kia`iawa, meaning "harbor guardian," which was used to patrol both Honolulu and Kalaeloa Barbers Point Harbors. Kia`iawa was christened in 2013. The vessel cost $390,000, which was paid using a federal grant, and featured upgraded equipment and features over the Moku Maka'i, including better radar, GPS, depth-finding devices, and a closed cabin and shock-absorbing seats.

The Harbor Police also utilized the Moku Maka`i, a 21-foot Boston Whaler, in service for nearly two decades, and was maintained as a supplemental patrol craft.

== See also ==
- Hawaii Department of Transportation
- Honolulu Harbor
