= Kaia Ranch Tropical Botanical Gardens =

Botanical garden in Hana, Hawaii, USA

Coordinates: 20°47′43″N 156°01′56″W

- Interactive map of Kaia Ranch Tropical Botanical Gardens
- Type: Botanical garden

Kaia Ranch Tropical Botanical Gardens is a small botanical garden located on the grounds of the Kaia Ranch Bed and Breakfast (27 acres), 470 Ulaino Road, Hāna, Maui, Hawaii.

The garden contains tropical flowers and fruits, as well as Polynesian introductions and Hawaiian native species.

== See also ==
- List of botanical gardens in the United States
