= Hana Airport =

Airport in Hawaii, United States

Hana Airport Kahua Mokulele o Hāna
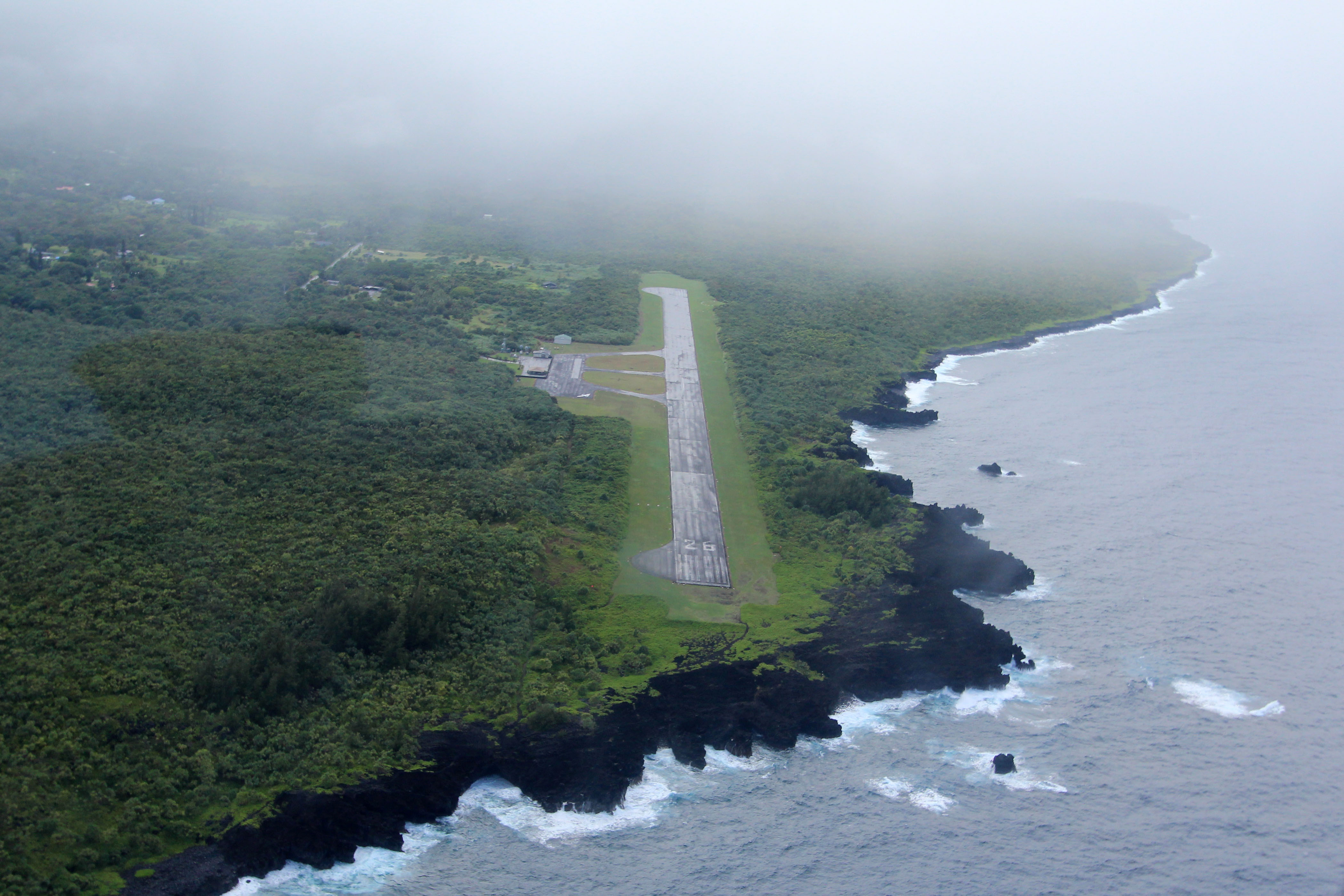
- An aerial view of runway 26 in August 2016
- IATA: HNM; ICAO: PHHN; FAA LID: HNM

Summary
- Airport type: Public
- Owner/Operator: Hawaii Department of Transportation
- Serves: Hana, Hawaii
- Opened: November 11, 1950
- Elevation AMSL: 78 ft (24 m)
- Coordinates: 20°47′44″N 156°00′52″W
- Website: hawaii.gov/hnm

Map
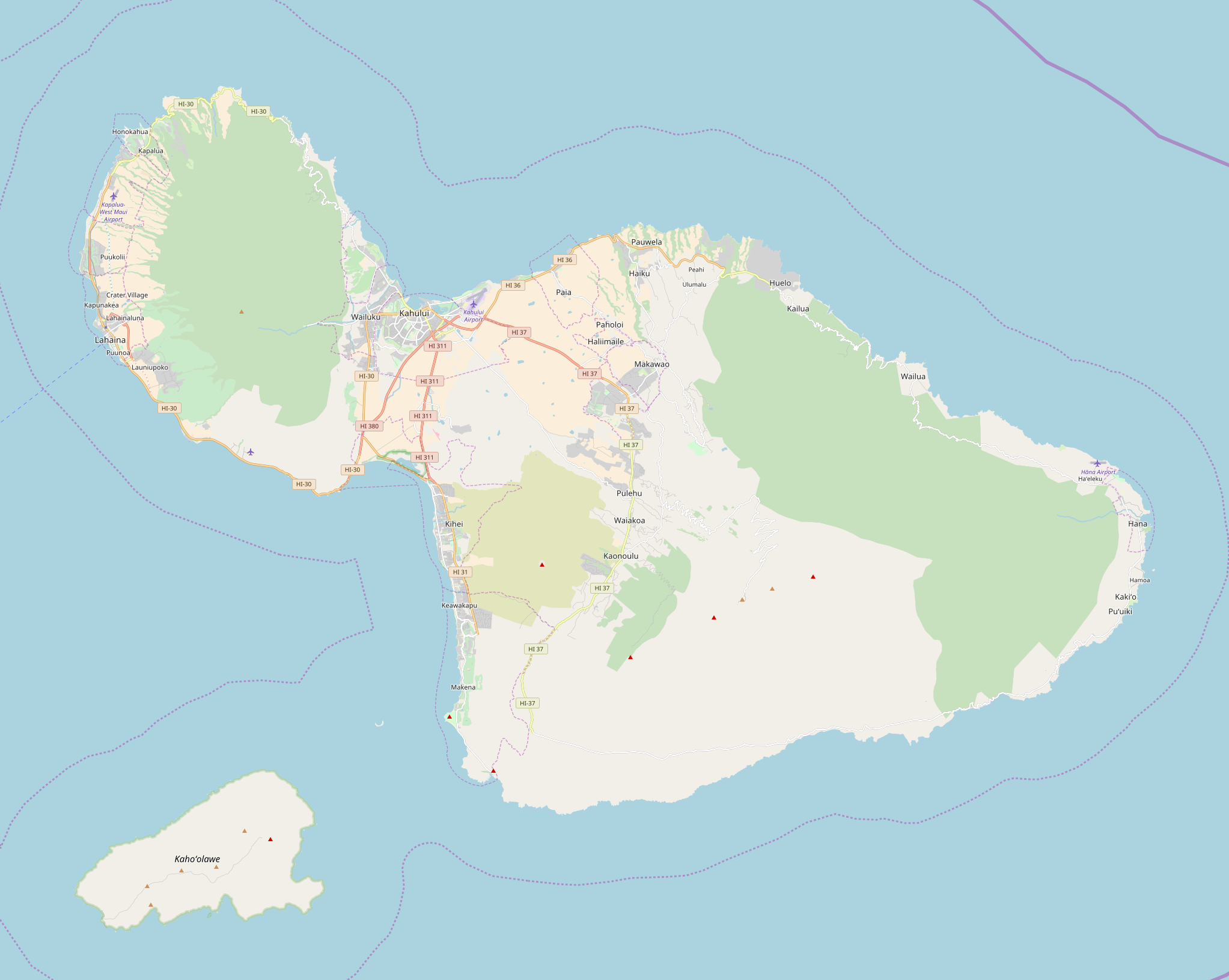
- Location of airport in Hawaii HNM (Hawaii)

Runways
| Direction | Length | | Surface |
| Direction | ft | m | Surface |
|---|---|---|---|
| 8/26 | 3,606 | 1,099 | Asphalt |

Statistics
- Aircraft operations (2014): 3,364
- Based aircraft (2022): 3
- Source: Federal Aviation Administration

Hana Airport (IATA: HNM, ICAO: PHHN, FAA LID: HNM) is a regional public use airport of the State of Hawaiʻi on the east shore of the island of Maui, three nautical miles (5.6 km; 3.5 mi) northwest of the unincorporated town of Hana. The airport was officially opened on November 11, 1950. It is primarily a commuter facility used by unscheduled air taxis and general aviation. As air traffic increases, the Hawaiʻi State Legislature will consider future improvements including the construction of a taxiway paralleling the runway, widening of access roads and expansion of passenger terminals and parking facilities.

Scheduled commercial airline service provided Pacific Wings was subsidized by the Essential Air Service program until April 1, 2007, when Pacific Wings began providing subsidy-free service; however, with fares as high as $200 each way, most travelers opted to drive rather than fly. According to U.S. Department of Transportation data, Pacific Wings transported only 375 passengers in the first 10 months of 2012, while Mokulele Airlines claims to have transported 1706 passengers since October 2012, according to their EAS bid for Kamuela service on May 23, 2013.

It is included in the Federal Aviation Administration (FAA) National Plan of Integrated Airport Systems for 2021–2025, in which it is categorized as a basic general aviation facility.

== Facilities and aircraft ==
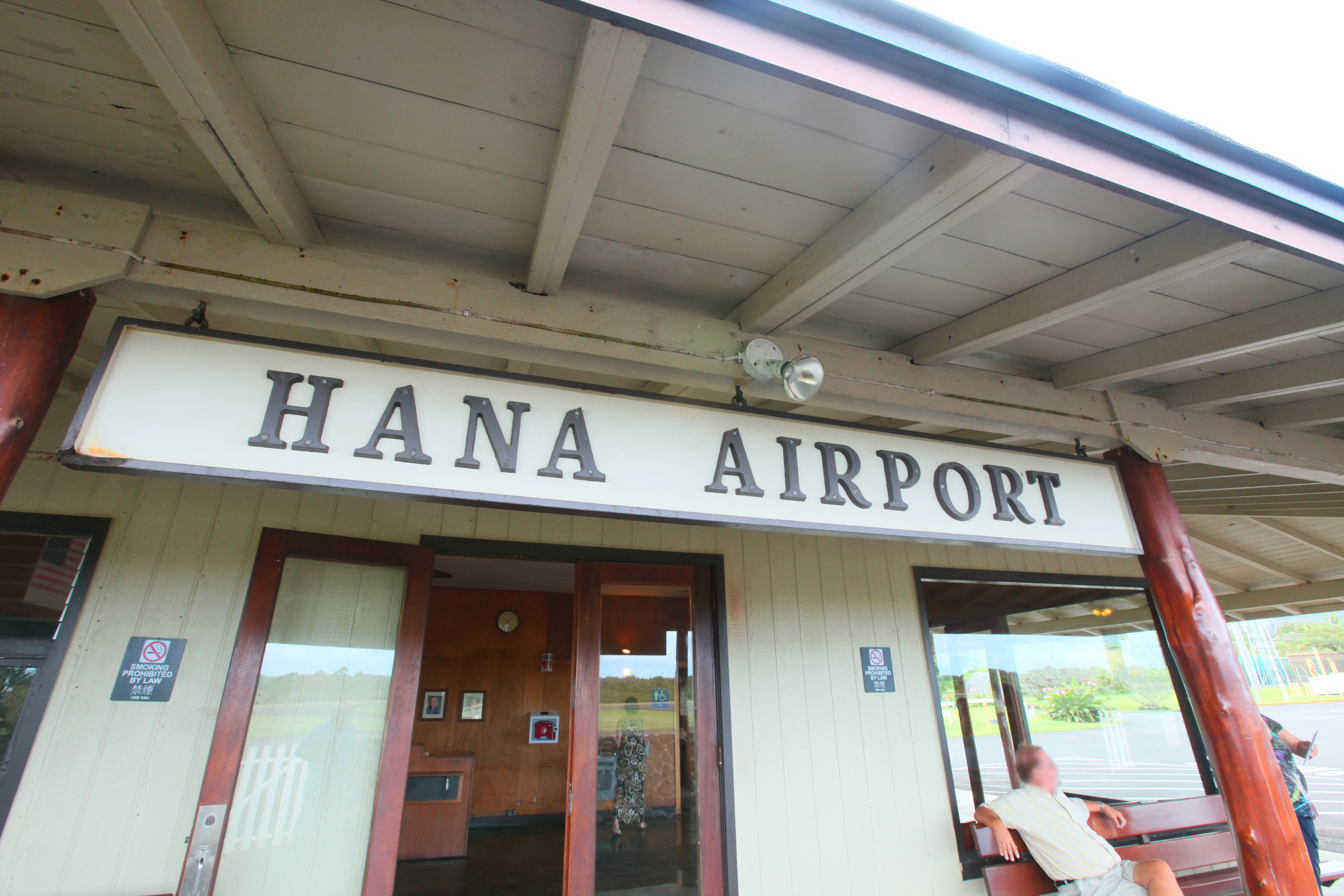
Hana Airport sign as seen in December 2011.

Hana Airport covers an area of 119 acres (48 ha) at an elevation of 78 feet (24 m) above mean sea level. It has one runway designated 8/26 with an asphalt surface measuring 3,606 by 100 feet (1,099 x 30 m).

For the 12-month period ending December 31, 2014, the airport had 3,364 aircraft operations, an average of 9 per day: 58% air taxi, 42% general aviation and less than 1% military. In April 2022, there were 3 aircraft based at this airport: 2 gliders and 1 ultra-light.

== Airline and destination ==
Mokulele Airlines provides a scheduled passenger service to Kahului Airport, Maui.

=== Historical airline service ===
Hawaiian Airlines was serving Hana in 1969 with Convair 640 turboprop flights from Kahului and Honolulu. According to the Official Airline Guide (OAG), two commuter air carriers were serving the airport in 1976, Island Pacific Air and Royal Hawaiian Airways, with both airlines operating small Cessna 402 twin prop aircraft on direct flights from Honolulu, Kahului, Kaunakaki and Lanai City with Royal Hawaiian also providing direct service from Hilo, Kaanapali, Kamuela, Kona and Upolu Point. Island Pacific Air then changed its name to Air Hawaii and was continuing to serve the airport in 1979. Princeville Airways was serving Hana in 1986 with de Havilland Canada DHC-6 Twin Otter turboprops with flights to Honolulu, Kahului and other destinations in Hawaii. By 1994, Aloha IslandAir (which formerly operated as Princeville Airways and was subsequently renamed Island Air (Hawaii)) was operating code share service on behalf of Aloha Airlines with DHC-6 Twin Otter turboprops on direct flights from Honolulu, Kahului, Lanai City and Molokai/Hoolehua according to the OAG.

== Authority ==
Hana Airport is part of a centralized state structure governing all of the airports and seaports of Hawaiʻi. The official authority of Hana Airport is the Governor of Hawaiʻi. The governor appoints the Director of the Hawai'i State Department of Transportation who has jurisdiction over the Hawaiʻi Airports Administrator.

The Hawaiʻi Airports Administrator oversees six governing bodies: Airports Operations Office, Airports Planning Office, Engineering Branch, Information Technology Office, Staff Services Office, Visitor Information Program Office. Collectively, the six bodies have authority over the four airport districts in Hawaiʻi: Hawai'i District, Kauaʻi District, Maui District and the principal Oʻahu District. Hana Airport is a subordinate of the Maui District officials.

== Media appearances ==
Hana Airport is the destination in the "Hawaiian Checkout" mission supplied with Microsoft Flight Simulator X.

== See also ==
- List of airports in Hawaii

== Other sources ==
- Essential Air Service documents (Docket OST-1999-6502) from the U.S. Department of Transportation:
  - Order 2005-3-34: re-selecting Pacific Wings Airlines to provide essential air service (EAS) at Hana, Kalaupapa, and Kamuela, Hawaii, for the period from April 1, 2005, through March 31, 2007, at an annual rate of $1,597,422 for the first year and at an annual rate of $1,501,752 for the second year.
  - Order 2006-12-3: terminating the carrier-selection proceeding for Essential Air Service at Hana, Kalaupapa, and Kamuela, Hawaii. The incumbent EAS carrier, Pacific Wings, has proposed to continue to provide all three communities' EAS on a subsidy-free basis beginning April 1, 2007.
