= Hāna, Hawaii =

Hāna
- Census-designated place
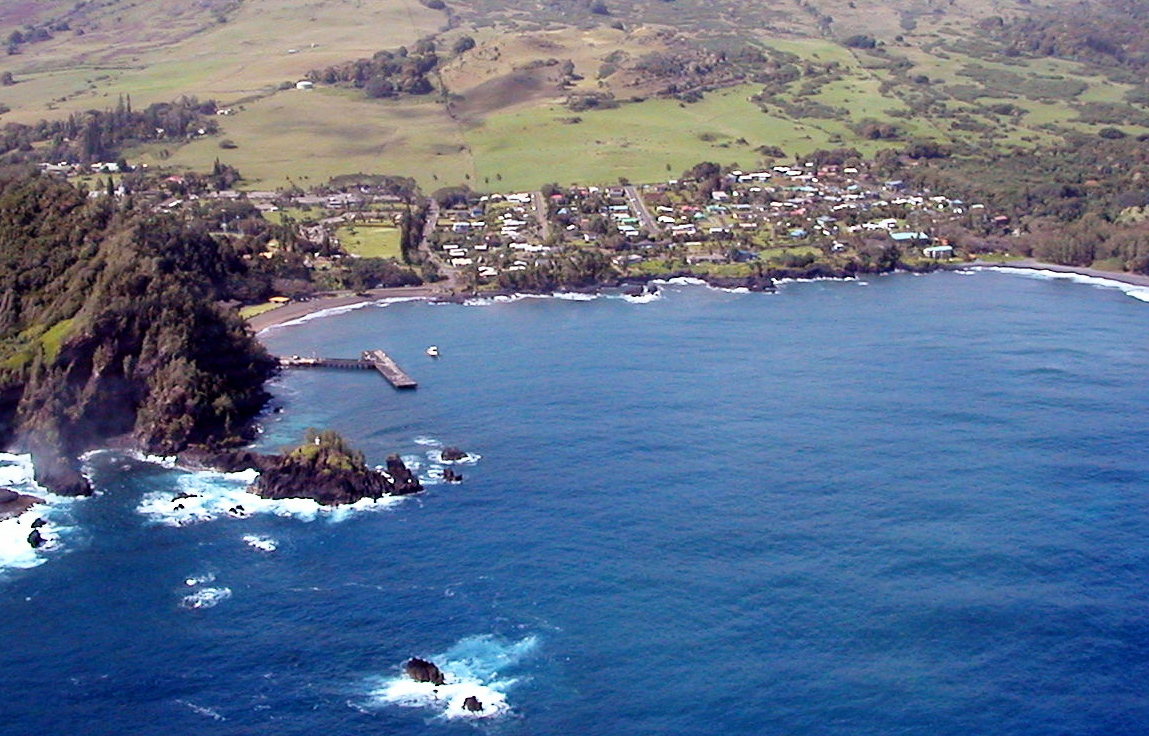
- Aerial view of Hāna, Maui

- Location in Maui County and the state of Hawaii
- Coordinates: 20°46′12″N 155°59′39″W
- Country: United States
- State: Hawaii
- County: Maui

Area
  - Total: 11.70 sq mi (30.30 km^{2})
  - Land: 10.56 sq mi (27.34 km^{2})
  - Water: 1.14 sq mi (2.96 km^{2})
- Elevation: 128 ft (39 m)

Population (2020)
  - Total: 1,526
  - Density: 144.5/sq mi (55.81/km^{2})
- Time zone: UTC-10 (Hawaii-Aleutian)
- ZIP code: 96713
- Area code: 808
- FIPS code: 15-11350
- GNIS feature ID: 0359013

Hāna is a census-designated place (CDP) in Maui County, Hawaii, United States. The population was 1,526 at the 2020 census. Hāna is located at the eastern end of the island of Maui and is one of the most isolated communities in the state. It is reached mainly via the Hana Highway, a long, winding, 52-mile-long (84 km) highway along Maui's northern shore, via boat, and with commercial air service to Hana Airport.

== History ==
The ancient district of Hāna

The modern district of Hāna

Like most of Hawaii, Hāna was probably first settled between 500 and 800 AD by Polynesian peoples.

The first sugarcane plantation in the area was established by George Wilfong in 1849, and by 1883 there were six plantations operating in the area. By 1946, however, the last sugarcane plantation had closed, leading plantation workers to move mostly to the west side of Maui. That same year saw the opening of the Kaʻuiki Inn, later known as the Hotel Travaasa – Hana and today as the Hyatt Hana-Maui Resort, which helped transition the economy towards tourism.

The winding, famously scenic Hana Highway was completed in 1926. Originally paved with gravel, it provided the first land vehicle access to the town. Hāna's population peaked in the first half of the twentieth century, with a population of about 3,500.

== Geography and climate ==
Hāna is located at 20°46′12″N 155°59′39″W (20.770017, −155.994179), directly on the East rift zone of East Maui Volcano (Haleakalā). The Hana Airport offers flights with regular service to the Big Island, Kahului, and Oʻahu.

According to the United States Census Bureau, this CDP has a total area of 11.7 square miles (30.3 km^{2}), of which 10.5 square miles (27.3 km^{2}) is land and 1.2 square miles (3.0 km^{2}), 9.77%, is water.

Near Hāna are natural areas and several swimming holes in the Haleakalā National Park.

Hāna's climate is hot and wet year round, typical of a tropical rainforest.

Climate data for Hana Airport 355, HI US (1991–2020 normals, extremes 1950–present)
Month	Jan	Feb	Mar	Apr	May	Jun	Jul	Aug	Sep	Oct	Nov	Dec	Year
Record high °F (°C)	91 (33)	88 (31)	88 (31)	88 (31)	89 (32)	89 (32)	90 (32)	89 (32)	91 (33)	91 (33)	94 (34)	89 (32)	94 (34)
Mean daily maximum °F (°C)	77.8 (25.4)	77.3 (25.2)	77.5 (25.3)	78.2 (25.7)	79.7 (26.5)	81.1 (27.3)	81.7 (27.6)	82.9 (28.3)	82.5 (28.1)	81.9 (27.7)	80.2 (26.8)	78.8 (26.0)	80.0 (26.7)
Daily mean °F (°C)	71.3 (21.8)	71.1 (21.7)	71.6 (22.0)	72.8 (22.7)	74.1 (23.4)	75.5 (24.2)	76.4 (24.7)	77.3 (25.2)	76.4 (24.7)	76.2 (24.6)	75.0 (23.9)	73.4 (23.0)	74.3 (23.5)
Mean daily minimum °F (°C)	64.8 (18.2)	65.0 (18.3)	65.7 (18.7)	67.4 (19.7)	68.4 (20.2)	69.8 (21.0)	71.2 (21.8)	71.7 (22.1)	70.3 (21.3)	70.5 (21.4)	69.8 (21.0)	68.0 (20.0)	68.5 (20.3)
Record low °F (°C)	50 (10)	50 (10)	52 (11)	52 (11)	56 (13)	59 (15)	56 (13)	59 (15)	59 (15)	58 (14)	54 (12)	53 (12)	50 (10)
Average rainfall inches (mm)	5.64 (143)	5.48 (139)	8.46 (215)	5.00 (127)	5.43 (138)	4.45 (113)	5.49 (139)	5.99 (152)	6.12 (155)	6.88 (175)	6.65 (169)	6.59 (167)	72.15 (1,833)
Source: NOAA

== Demographics ==
Historical population
Census	Pop.	Note	%±
2020	1,526		—
U.S. Decennial Census

As of the census of 2010, Hāna had 1,235 residents, 390 households, and 252 families residing in the CDP. The 2010 population density was 105.6 people per square mile (40.8 people per square kilometer). There were 506 housing units at an average density of 48.2/sq mi. The racial makeup of the CDP was 22.2% White, 0.1% African American, 0.1% American Indian and Alaska Native, 5.0% Asian, 29.1% Pacific Islander, 0.8% from some other race, and 42.8% from two or more races. Hispanic or Latino residents of any race were 9.8% of the population.

As of 2010, there were 390 households, out of which 23.8% had children under the age of 18 living with them, 45.6% were headed by married couples living together, 9.7% had a female householder with no husband present, and 35.4% were non-families. 29.5% of all households were made up of individuals, and 9.7% were someone living alone who was 65 years of age or older. The average household size was 3.17, and the average family size was 3.99.

As of 2010, 27.8% of the population was under the age of 18, 8.5% was from 18 to 24, 24.3% from 25 to 44, 25.7% from 45 to 64, and 13.5% was 65 years of age or older. The median age was 35.2 years. For every 100 females, there were 105.5 males. For every 100 females age 18 and over, there were 111.9 males.

As of 2000, the median income for a household in the CDP was $50,833, and the median income for a family was $54,167. Males had a median income of $26,146 versus $22,969 for females. The per capita income for the CDP was $14,672. About 5.6% of families and 8.6% of the population were below the poverty line, including 10.4% of those under age 18 and 3.8% of those age 65 or over.

== Points of interest ==
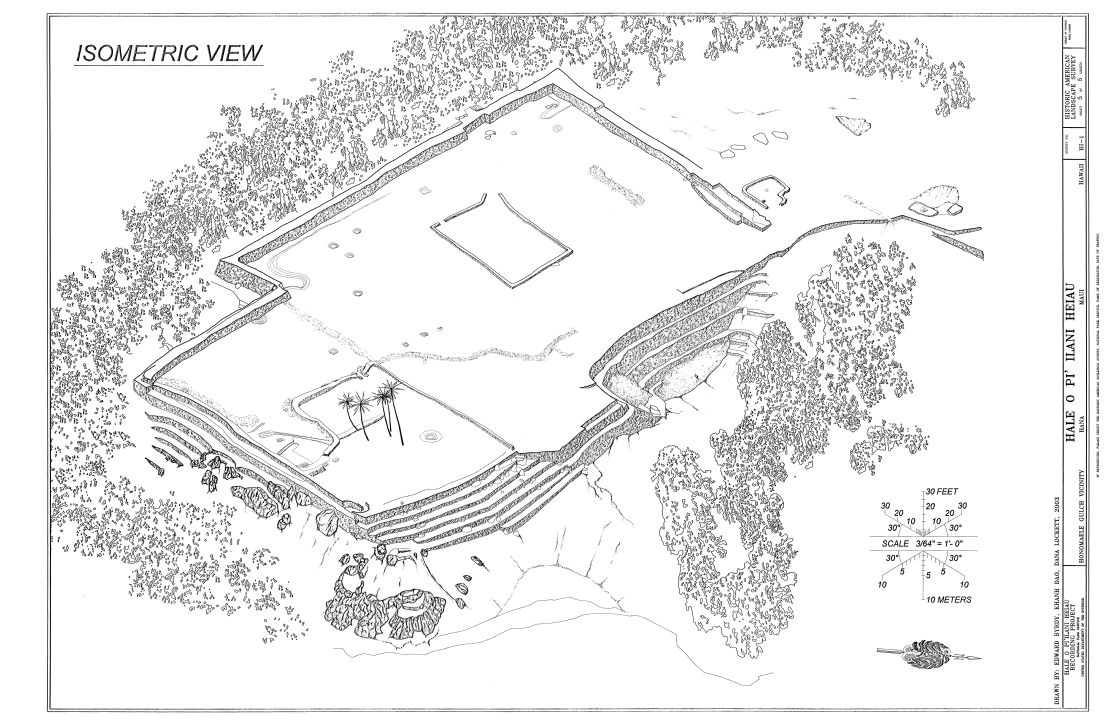
Hale O Pi ʻIlani Heiau, an ancient heiau temple platform near Honomaele Gulch.

- Fagan's Cross
- Pi'i-lani Temple – constructed in the 15th century, this is the largest temple in Hawaii
- Kahanu Garden
- Kaia Ranch Tropical Botanical Gardens
- Hāna Beach Park
- Hāna Ball Park
- Pailoa Bay
- Hamoa Beach
- Waiʻanapanapa State Park
- Hasegawa General Store

== Popular culture ==
Hāna's surfing culture was profiled by writer Susan Orlean in Outside magazine in 1998, inspiring the 2002 film Blue Crush.

== Health care ==
Although not technically a hospital or emergency room, Hana Health Clinic (or Hana Medical Center), works in cooperation with American Medical Response and Maui Memorial Medical Center to stabilize and transport patients with emergent medical conditions. It is open 24/7 for urgent care and emergency access. The facility also offers routine physical exams, acute care, chronic disease management (heart disease, diabetes, asthma), cancer screening (Pap smears, mammograms, prostate and colon), routine gynecology, family planning services, basic laboratory and x-ray, on-site medication dispensary, and referrals for specialty care.

== Economy ==
Major employers in Hana include the Hana Maui hotel, Hana High and Elementary School, and Waiʻanapanapa State Park.

== Education ==
The Hawaii Department of Education, the statewide school district, operates Hana High and Elementary School. The Hawaii State Public Library System operates the Hana Public and School Library.

== Tourism ==
After the Kaʻeleku Sugar Company closed in 1946, ending nearly a century of sugar production in East Maui—sugarcane magnate and San Francisco entrepreneur Paul Fagan purchased thousands of acres in Hāna to pivot the local economy toward hospitality. That same year, Fagan opened the six-room Kaʻuiki Inn, named after Hāna's iconic Puʻu Kaʻuiki headland. To put his new destination on the map, Fagan brought his minor-league baseball team, the San Francisco Seals, alongside a host of sports journalists to Hāna for 1947 spring training. The resulting media fanfare coined the phrase "Heavenly Hāna" and launched Maui’s resort tourism industry, with the modest inn evolving into the renowned Hotel Hāna-Maui (now the Hāna-Maui Resort) and firmly establishing tourism as the backbone of Hāna's modern economy. The monument featuring a cross, overlooking Hāna, celebrates Paul Fagan’s legacy.

According to the 2020–2024 American Community Survey, approximately 31 percent of Hāna's employed residents worked in accommodation and food services, while another 16 percent worked in arts, entertainment, and recreation. These categories, which include many tourism-related jobs, together accounted for approximately 200 residents, or 47 percent of the community's employed population.

Although most visitors experience Hāna as a day trip, overnight accommodation is available in and around the community. Lodging includes the Hāna-Maui Resort, the Hāna Kai Maui condominium complex, a small inn, and licensed vacation-rental homes, cottages, studios, and bed-and-breakfast properties.

=== Tourism management ===
High visitor volumes along the Hana Highway have contributed to traffic congestion, roadside parking, trespassing, environmental impacts, and safety concerns. Residents have also reported that visitor traffic can obstruct the narrow highway, which serves as the principal transportation route for East Maui communities.

In response, government agencies and community organizations have introduced measures to manage visitor access. Non-Hawaii residents must obtain advance entry and parking reservations for Waiʻānapanapa State Park. The state attributed the reservation system to increased crowding, commercial tour traffic, effects on the neighboring rural community, and diminished visitor experiences.

The Hawaii Tourism Authority, Maui County, local organizations, and East Maui community representatives also established the Mālama Maui Hikina program to manage culturally and environmentally sensitive locations along the highway. The program has used on-site stewards, community-created visitor messaging, data collection, resident surveys, and cultural workshops. According to the Tourism Authority, the program reduced illegal parking, trespassing, and visitor injuries at managed locations.

== Notable residents ==
- William Kwai-sun Chow, was raised here
- Queen Kaʻahumanu, born in Hana in 1768
- Charles Lindbergh, retired there in the 1970s and was buried near Hana in 1974
- Pat Benatar, married to Neil Giraldo in Hana in 1982, has houses in Hana and in California.
- George Harrison and his wife Olivia Harrison had a property in Hana. Harrison wrote the song Soft-Hearted Hana about time spent in Hawaii.
- Kris Kristofferson lived and died in Hana.
- Frank Herbert, the science fiction author, moved to Hana in 1980, toward the end of his life.
- Jim "Kimo" West, part-time resident
- "Weird Al" Yankovic, part-time resident
- Richard Pryor, Renowned comedian/ Actor. Announced he was moving to Hana, Hawaii on the Tonight Show with Johnny Carson on September 5, 1980. His cremated remains were scattered in Hana, bay, in 2017 by his widow.

== Gallery ==
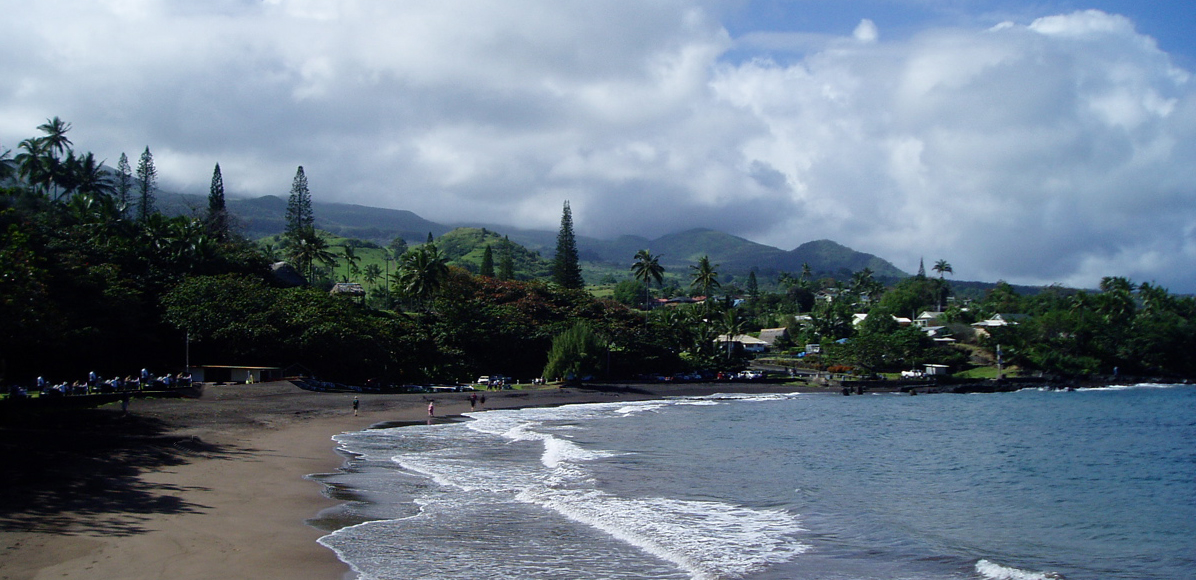
Hana Beach Park

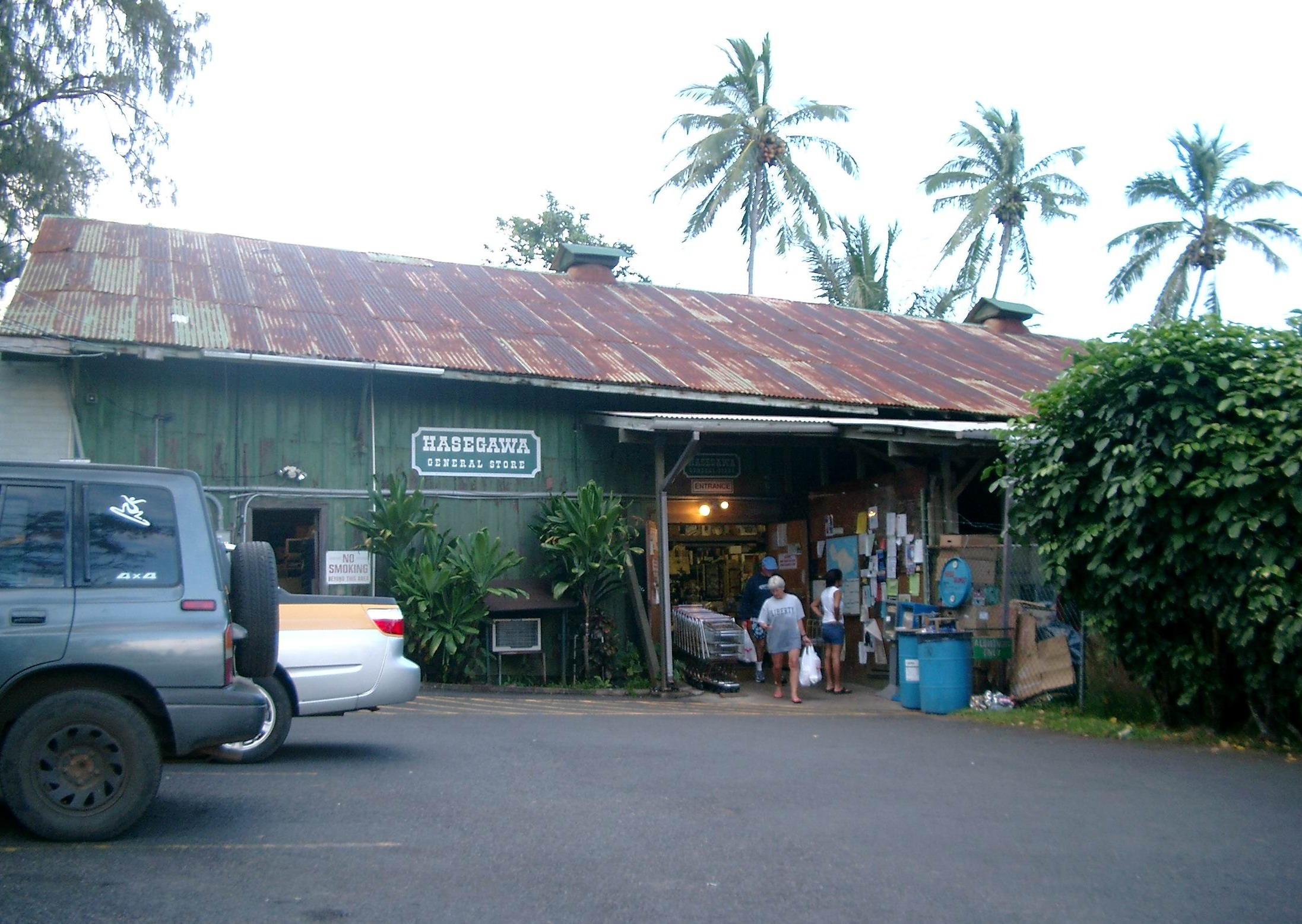
Hasegawa General Store

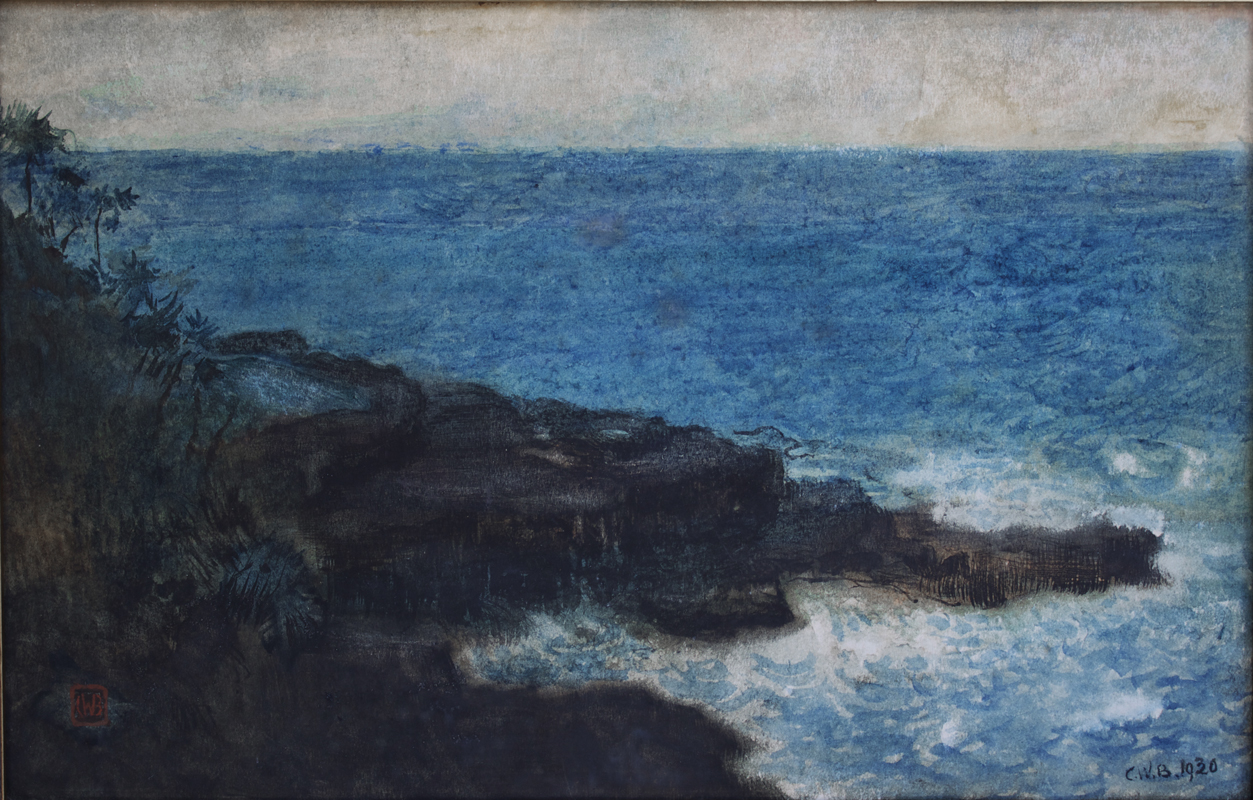
'Hana Maui Coast',
by Charles W. Bartlett (1920)

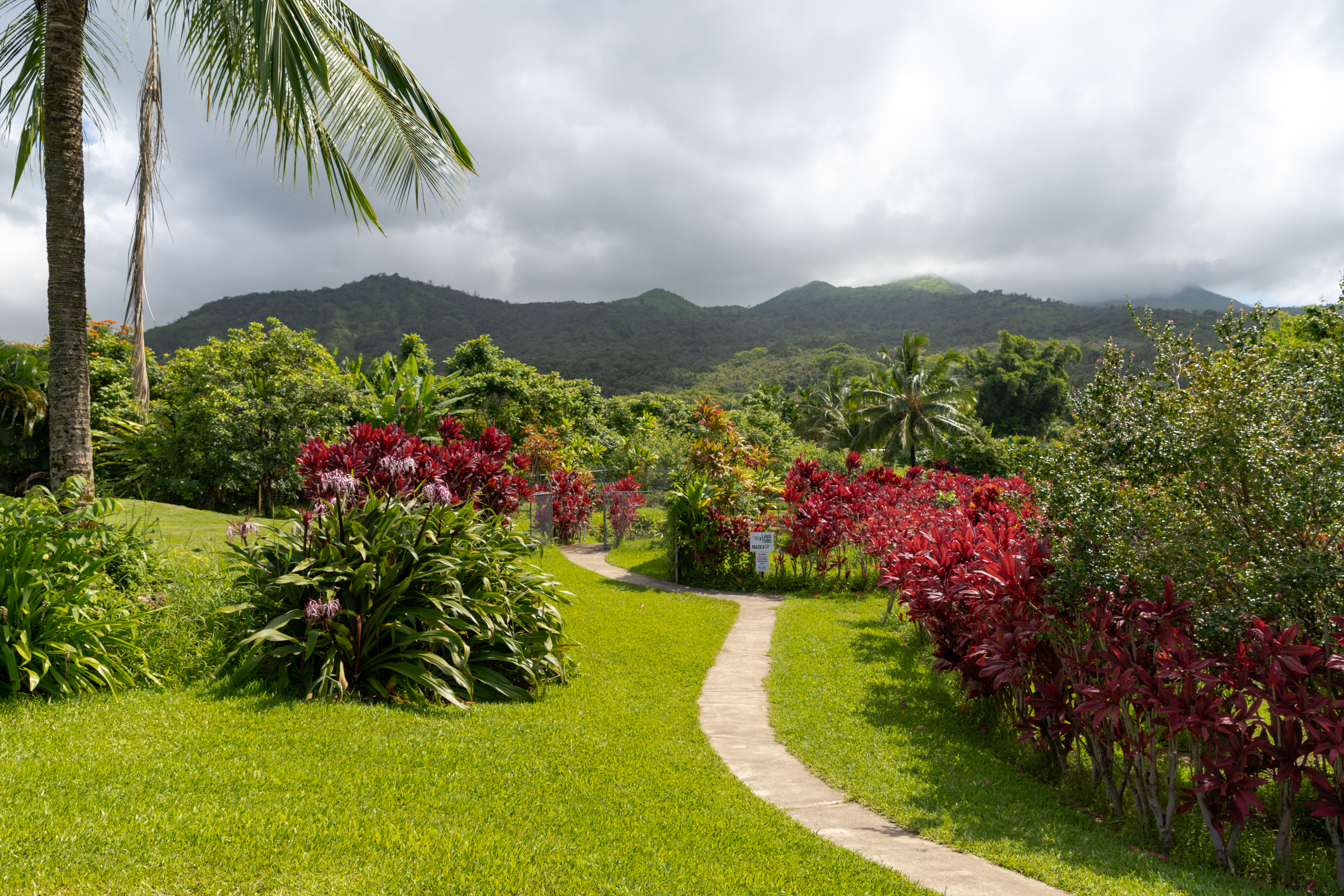
Hana Lava tube garden
