= Hawaii Department of Transportation =

Government agency in Hawaii, United States

Hawaii Department of Transportation (HDOT)

Agency overview
- Formed: 1959
- Jurisdiction: Hawaii
- Headquarters: Aliiaimoku Building, 869 Punchbowl Street, Honolulu, Hawaii
- Agency executives: Edwin Sniffen, Director; Roy Catalani, Deputy Director
- Parent agency: State of Hawaii
- Website: hidot.hawaii.gov

The Hawaii Department of Transportation (HDOT) is a state government organization which oversees transportation in the U.S. state of Hawaii. The agency is divided into three divisions dealing with aviation, maritime, and roads.

== HDOT Divisions ==
=== Airports Division ===
The HDOT Airports Division operates all the public airports throughout the state including Daniel K. Inouye International Airport. The Division is divided into offices, branches and divisions to provide services based on location or specialization.

- Airports Administrator - oversees all state owned airports
- Staff Services Office - provides administrative support
- Visitor Information Program Office - manages the state Visitor Information Program in coordination with other HDOT divisions
- Information Technology Office - provides information technology support
- Airports Operations Office - provides operational support including firefighting at state owned airports
- Engineering Branch - provides engineering support
- Oahu District - maintains airports on the island of Oahu
- Maui District - maintains airports on the island of Maui
- Hawaii District - maintains airports on the island of Hawaii
- Kauai District - maintains airports on the island of Kauai
- Hawaii Harbor Police Division

==== Airports maintained by HDOT Airports Division ====
- Kalaeloa Airport (JRF)
- Dillingham Airfield (HDH)
- Honolulu International Airport (HNL)
- Hana Airport (HNM)
- Hilo International Airport (ITO)
- Kalaupapa Airport (LUP)
- Lanai Airport (LNY)
- Lihue Airport (LIH)
- Kahului Airport (OGG)
- Kona International Airport at Keahole (KOA)
- Upolu Airport (UPP)
- Molokai Airport (MKK)
- Kapalua Airport (JHM)
- Waimea-Kohala Airport (MUE)
- Port Allen Airport (PAK)

=== Harbors Division ===
On July 1, 1961, the functions, duties and powers of the Board of Harbor Commissioners of the Territory of Hawaii were transferred to the state Department of Transportation. The HDOT Harbors Division operates ten commercial harbors throughout the state. The division is self-sufficient, with the majority of its income coming from various harbor and wharf rental fees.

=== Commercial Harbors operated by HDOT Harbors Division ===
The HDOT Harbors Division operates ten commercial harbors throughout the state. The division is self-sufficient, with the majority of its income coming from various harbor and wharf rental fees.

- Honolulu Harbor
- Kalaeloa - Barbers Point Harbor
- Kahalui Harbor
- Hana Harbor
- Hilo Harbor
- Kawaihae Harbor
- Nawiliwili Harbor
- Port Allen Harbor
- Kaunakakai Harbor
- Kaumalapau Harbor

=== Highways Division ===
The HDOT Highways Division maintains the state highway system.

== See also ==
- Hawaii Harbor Police
- Kona Airport
