= Lahaina Banyan Court Park =

Public park in Lahaina, Hawaii

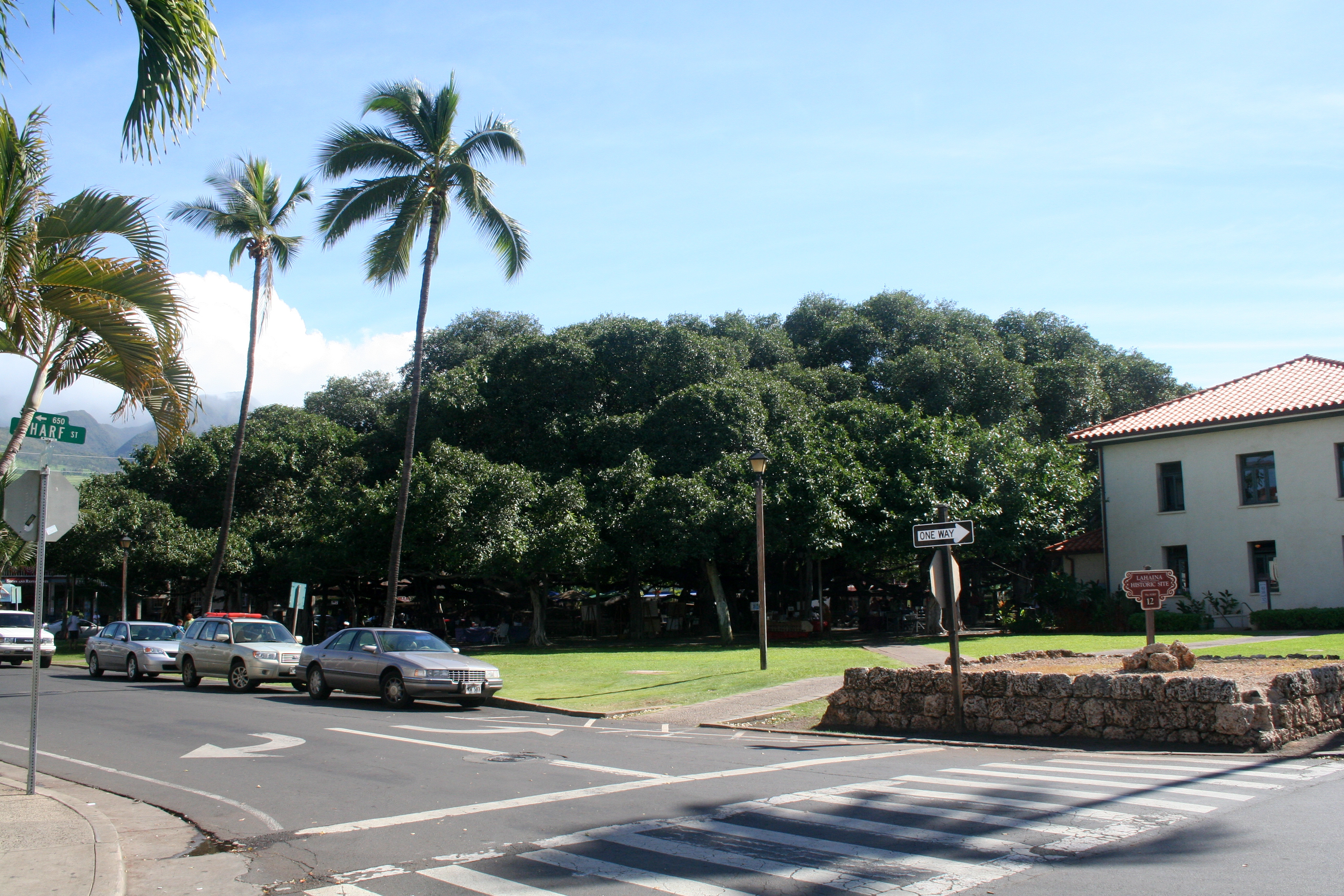
- Lahaina Banyan Court Park facing east from the corner of Hotel and Wharf Street, in 2007

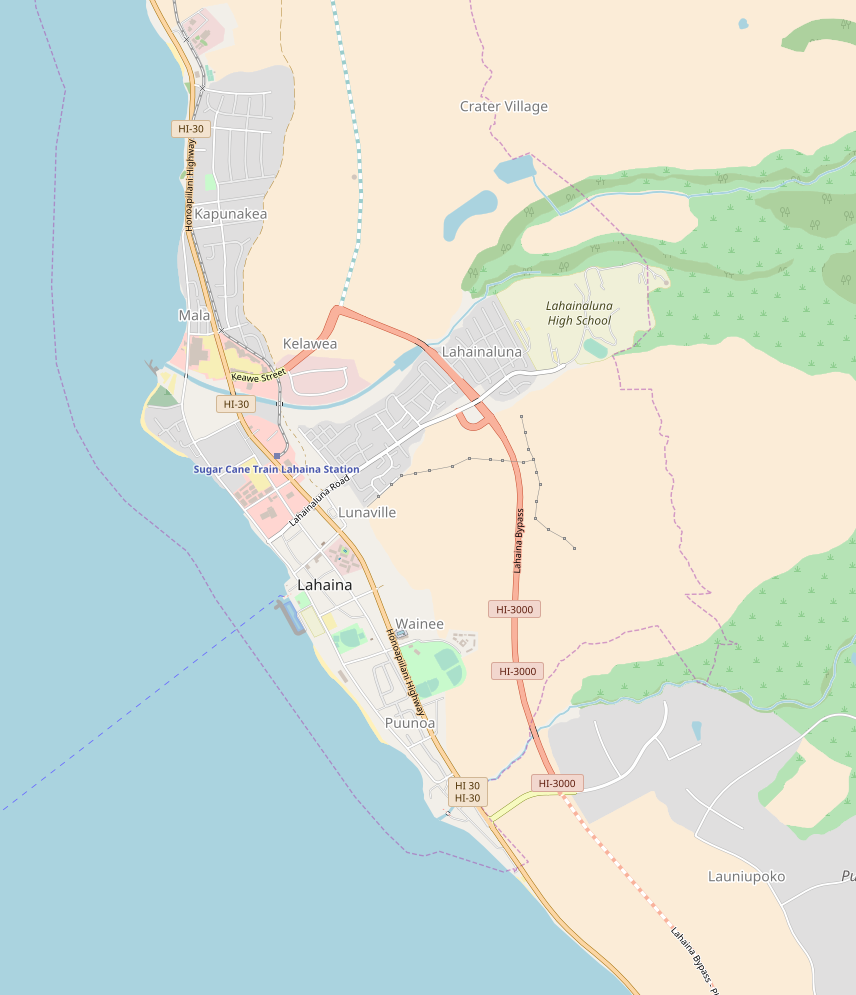
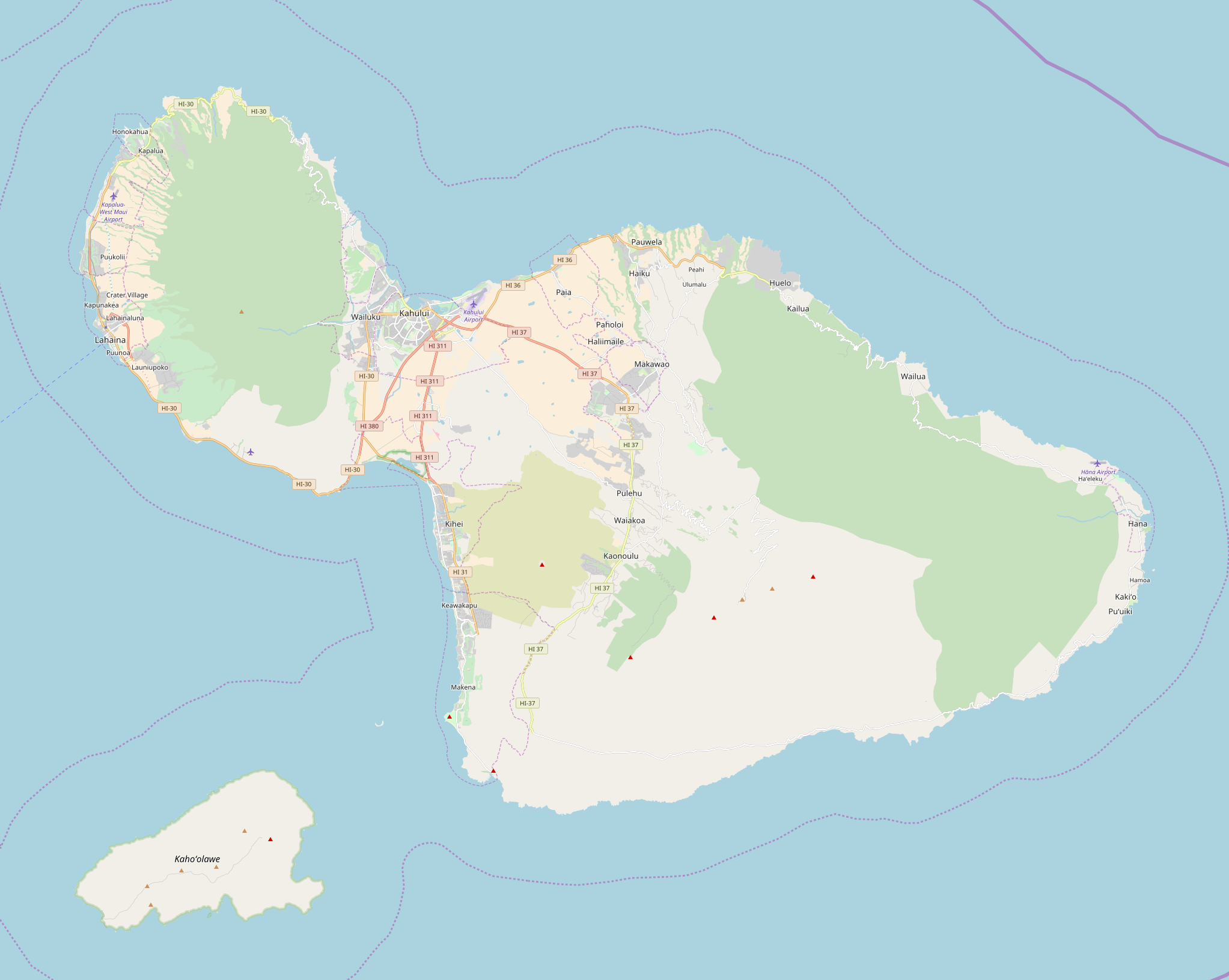
- Location within Lahaina, Hawaii Location within Maui Location within Hawaii
- Type: Natural Area
- Location: Lahaina, Maui
- Coordinates: 20°52′18″N 156°40′39″W
- Area: 1.94 acres (0.79 ha)
- Created: 1873
- Operator: County of Maui
- Open: All year
- Parking: Limited public parking

Lahaina Banyan Court Park is a public park in the town of Lahaina, Hawaii, The 1.94 acres (0.79 ha) park, also known as Lahaina Courthouse Square and commonly called Banyan Tree Park, contains multiple heritage sites. Located at the corner of Front Street and Canal Street, it is part of the Lahaina Historic Districts.

The park occupies the site of the Old Lahaina Fort, originally built in 1831. Hoapili, the Royal Governor of Maui, built the fort to protect the town from riotous sailors when Lahaina was used as an anchorage for the North Pacific whaling fleet. After the fort was demolished in 1854, a courthouse was built on the site. A portion of the old Lahaina Fort was reconstructed in 1964. The old Lahaina Courthouse was recognized as a contributing property of the Lahaina Historic District in 1965, and was used by the Lahaina Arts Society, Lahaina Restoration Foundation and the Lahaina Town Action Committee.

Sheriff William Owen Smith planted an Indian banyan tree in the courtyard square in 1873 to memorialize the 50th anniversary of the first American Protestant mission in Lahaina. The banyan tree was the largest banyan tree in Hawaii, and one of the largest banyan trees in the United States. Its extensive trunk and aerial root system now covers 0.66 acres (0.27 ha). The park is managed by the County of Maui and the Lahaina Restoration Foundation.

The property, including the courthouse and the tree, were engulfed by the 2023 Hawaii wildfires from August 8–9, which burned the historic town of Lahaina. The banyan tree was damaged and the Old Lahaina Court House was destroyed. Disaster recovery efforts are underway to determine the scope of the damage.

== Geography ==
Lahaina Banyan Court Park is located in the port of Lahaina town on the west side of the Hawaiian island of Maui. The park square comprises 1.94 acres (0.79 ha) on the site of the old Lahaina Fort, directly across the street from the Lahaina small boat harbor. It is bounded by Hotel Street to the north, Canal Street to the south, Wharf Street to the west, and Front Street to the east. Historic sites in the area include the former site of Lahaina's Beach—dredged during the construction of Lahaina's Harbor in 1955, the Pioneer Inn and the Keawaiki lighthouse to the north, and the campus of King Kamehameha III Elementary School—an archaeological site associated with the aliʻi—to the south.

== Background ==
New England whaling ships hunting sperm whales in the Pacific began to arrive in Hawaiʻi in 1819, and many ships anchored in Honolulu and Lahaina. The impact of the whaling fleets on the Hawaiian Islands during the reign of Kamehameha III (1825–1854) shaped the entire Hawaiian economy and was the primary source of income for the islands until the discovery of oil in Titusville, Pennsylvania, in 1859 and the onset of the American Civil War (1861–1865).

Ships would generally seek repairs in Honolulu, but captains preferred anchoring off Lahaina because of its easy access from the Lahaina Roads and for the fresh provisions available in town. According to Henry L. Sheldon, "the business of the entire population was the furnishing of supplies to whalers and entertaining the crews". Sailors who had been hunting whales for months at a time went to Lahaina to drink grog and meet women. Historian Noelani M. Arista notes that by 1825;

a kapu prohibiting women from going out to ships for the purpose of prostitution was proclaimed by the ali'i (Hawaiian chiefs), altering that familiar traffic of the burgeoning Pacific seaport towns. Enraged that they could not cajole, coax, or coerce Hawaiian women into violating the kapu, the sailors turned their frustrations on the American missionaries, whom they blamed for the emergence of this new unreasonably strict moral law.

Whalers opposed any rules governing alcohol and prostitution, and blamed missionaries for influencing the Kingdom of Hawaii to enforce such rules. Riots broke out at least four times—in 1825, 1826, 1827, and 1843. In the 1827 riots, the whaler John Palmer fired cannon shots over the home of missionary William Richards and threatened the safety of the community.

== Lahaina Fort ==
Queen Kaʻahumanu (1768–1832) visited Maui in February 1832, just months before she died, to support the construction of a new fort to protect the town from whalers. With her help, Hoapili (1775–1840), Royal Governor of Maui, built the fort on the Lahaina waterfront and it was completed within a month. The fort was constructed from coral blocks with walls approximately 15–20 ft (4.6–6.1 m) high topped with 47 cannons. An 1848 inventory lists 6 large cannons, 21 small cannons, 6 breech-loaders, and 8 which did not work. The fort stored quantities of gunpowder, guns, rifles, and swords, and was used as a prison. Sailors who docked at Lahaina were subject to a sunset curfew; it they did not return to their ship when the drums sounded they would be imprisoned in the fort.

In 1841, American naval officer Charles Wilkes (1798–1877) visited Lahaina Fort as commanding officer of the United States Exploring Expedition. Wilkes observed, "After the king's palace, the fort is the most conspicuous object: it is of little account, however, as a defence, serving chiefly to confine unruly subjects and sailors in. The area within is about one acre, and the walls are twenty feet high."

As the whaling industry declined and the California Gold Rush gained prominence in the late 1840s, Hawaii's population dropped, and infectious disease epidemics contributed to the loss of local populations. The fort was restored in 1847 but was now used more as a prison than for defending the Kingdom. The cannons were rusting and the fort was mostly empty of personnel except for a few soldiers and the Governor of Maui who lived there. When Henry Augustus Wise visited in 1848, he met James Young (1797–1851), then Governor of Maui, who was living in the fort. Wise wrote that it was:

an oddly assorted battery of some thirty pieces of artillery, of all sorts of carriages and calibre—long, short, and mediums; they command the usual anchorage, and no doubt do very well to prevent any acts of violence from merchant ships; but it is a question, if, at the second discharge of shot, they do not tumble to pieces.

In the 1850s, whaling began its steep decline. The forts in the Hawaiian Islands were in poor condition due to damage and neglect, and were either abandoned or removed. Lahaina Fort was demolished in 1854. Its coral blocks were reused to build Hale Paʻahao, a new prison at Wainee Street and Prison Road. In 1964, the State Parks Department placed a reconstruction of the old fort wall in the southwest corner of the park.

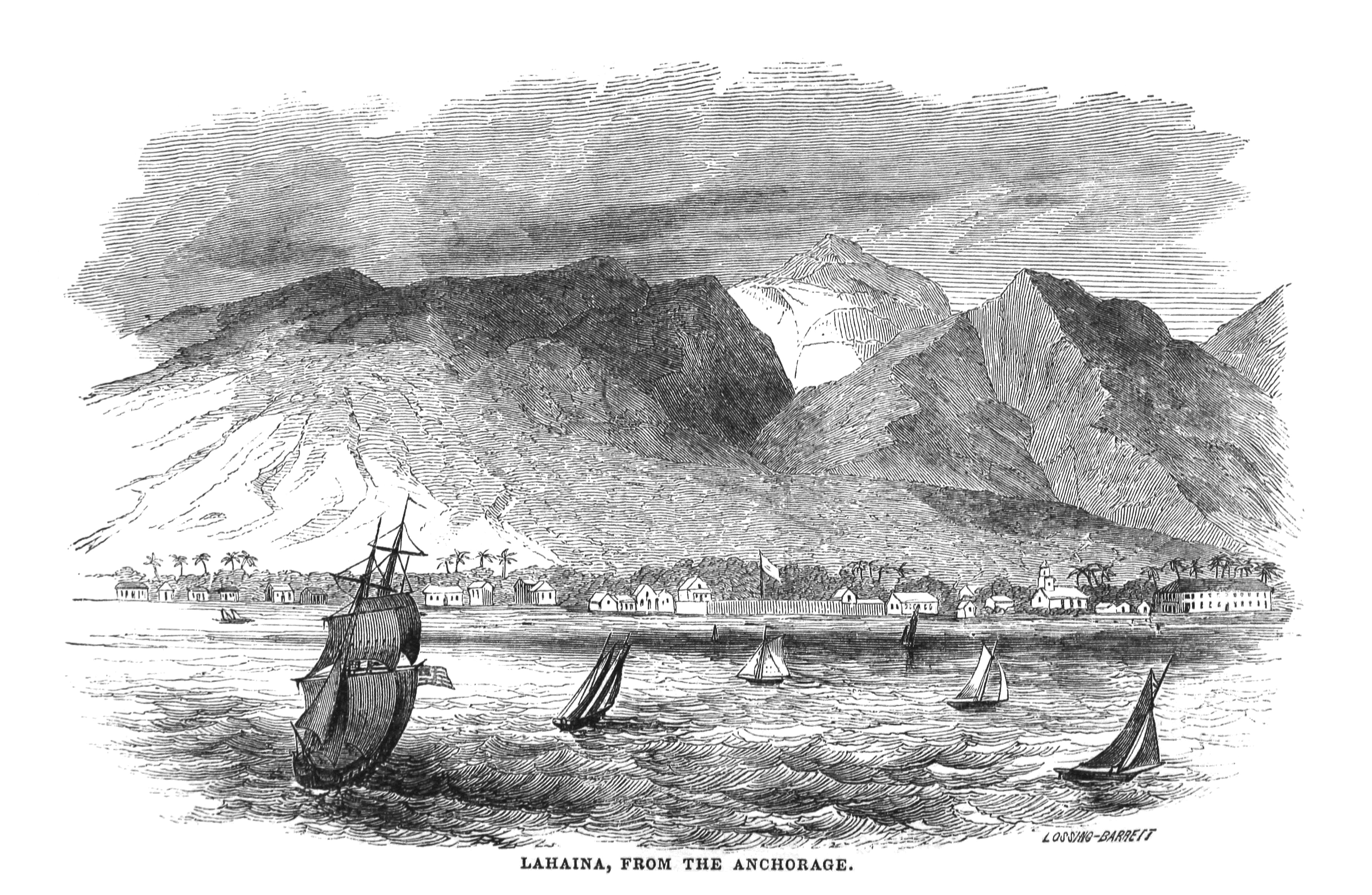
Exterior of Lahaina Fort (center) and Hale Piula (right) as viewed from ships anchored in Lahaina Roads in the 1840s

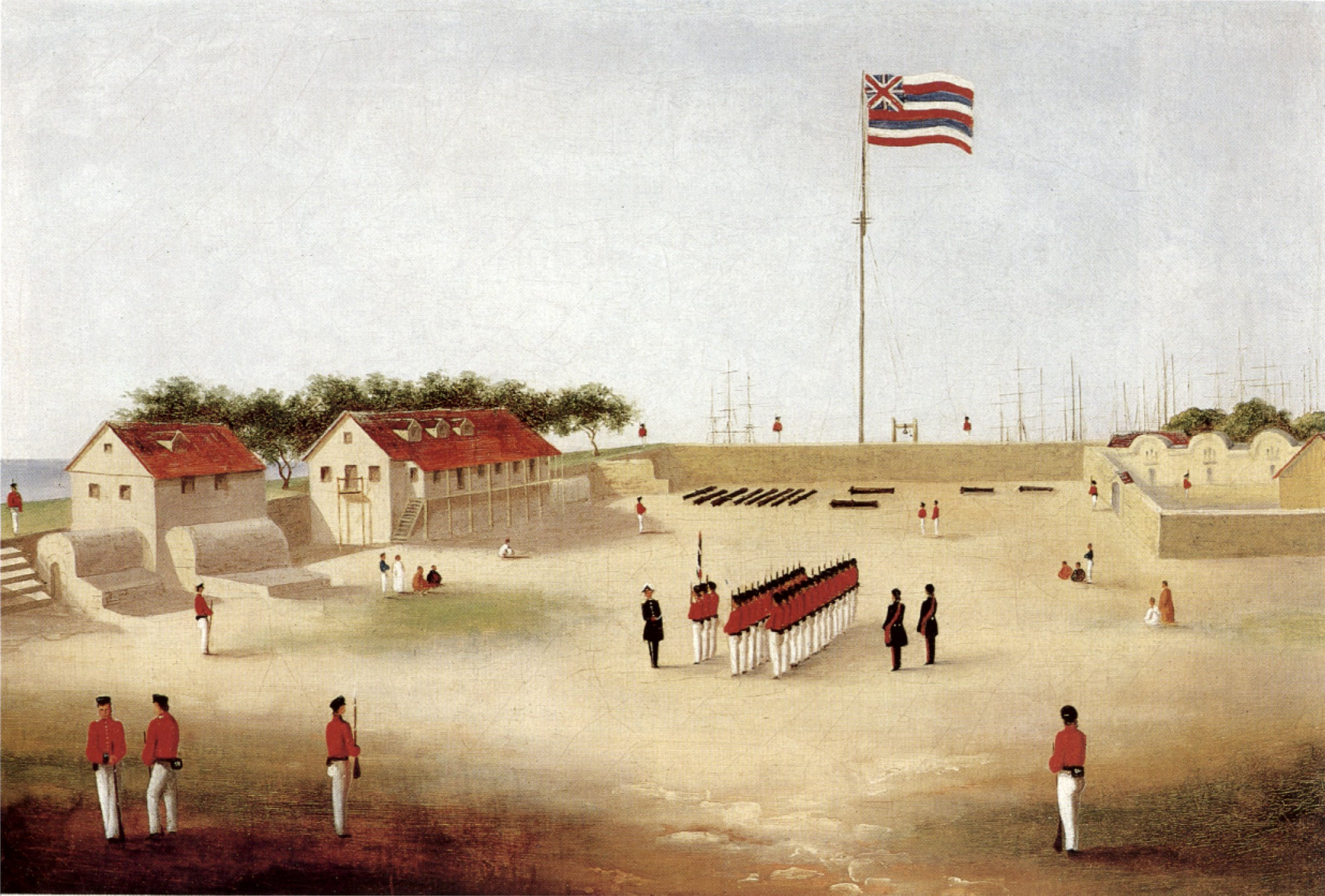
Interior of the Honolulu Fort in 1853. The layout of Lahaina Fort was similar but smaller.

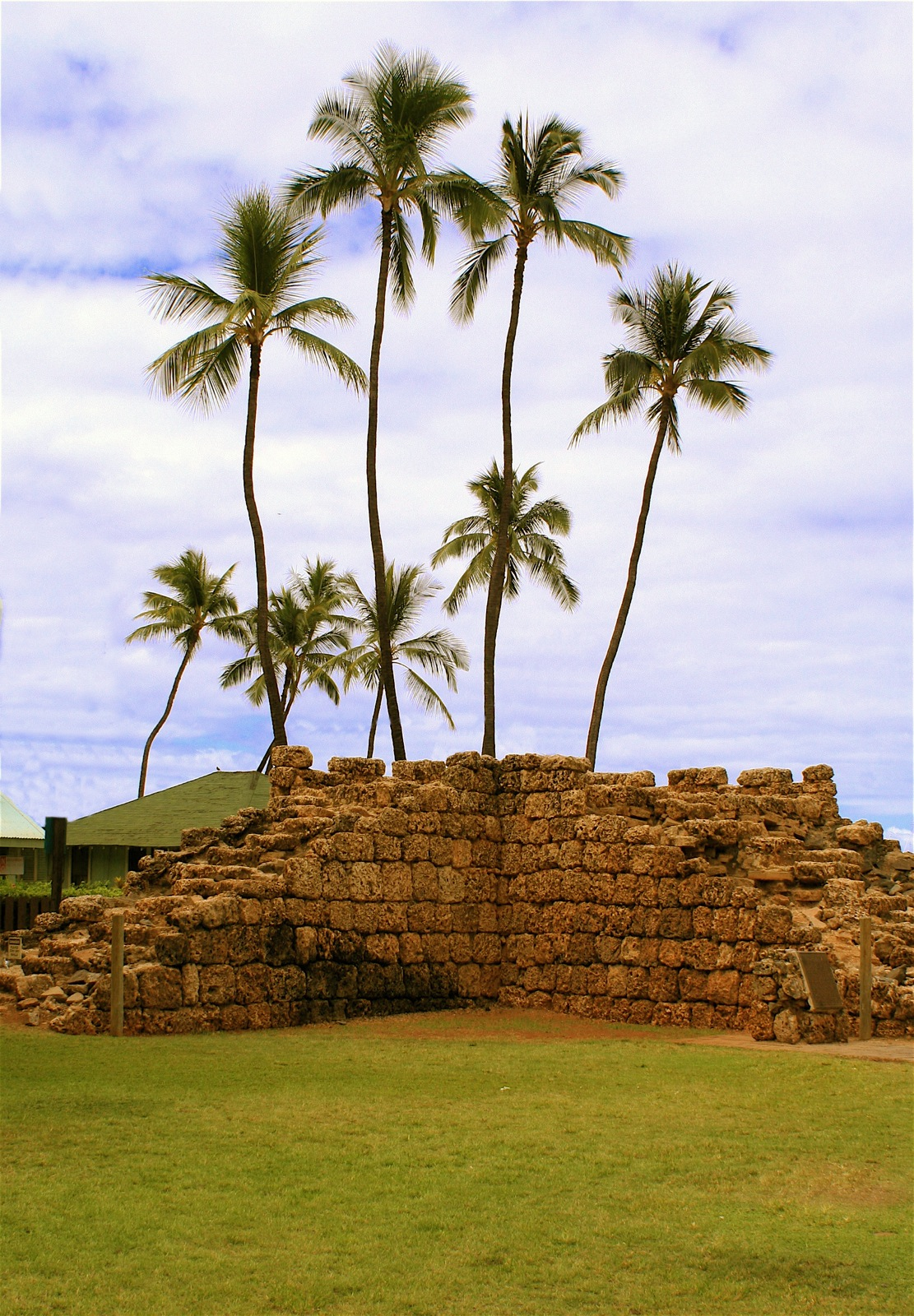
1964 reconstruction of the old fort

== Lahaina Courthouse ==
On February 20, 1858, Lahaina experienced a violent hurricane that destroyed approximately twenty buildings, including the original courthouse at Hale Piula, initially intended as a palace for Kamehameha III. The courthouse was rebuilt on the site of Lahaina Fort in 1859 using stones from Hale Piula. The new courthouse housed offices for customs, the postal service, the tax collector, the governor of Maui, a magistrates' court, a courtroom, and a jury room. When the Kingdom was overthrown, the flag of Hawaii at the Lahaina Courthouse was lowered by the assistant postmaster on August 12, 1898, and the flag of the United States was raised in its place. The Hawaiian flag was placed on display in a permanent exhibit at the courthouse in September 2002. The post office at the courthouse replaced the Hawaiian stamp with the US stamp on June 14, 1900.

The courthouse was restored by architect William D'Esmond in 1925. D'Esmond added a new roof and redesigned the entryway and balcony. The building's tenants included the US Post Office and a tax office. The courtroom was upstairs and the Lahaina jail was housed in the basement. The building was listed as a National Historic Landmark and a contributing property of the Lahaina Historic District in 1965, and was restored again in 1990. In the 1970s, it became known as the Old Courthouse when the court functions were moved to a new civic center. The Old Courthouse then became home to the Lahaina Heritage Museum and its collection, art galleries, a visitor center, a community meeting room, and public restrooms. The Lahaina Heritage Museum reopened upstairs in 2004 with interactive exhibits including videos, photographs, and historical objects. The Lahaina Arts Council and the Lahaina Historic Society also had offices in the courthouse.

The courthouse was destroyed by the Hawaii wildfires in August 2023. Only its charred outer walls made of coral were left standing.

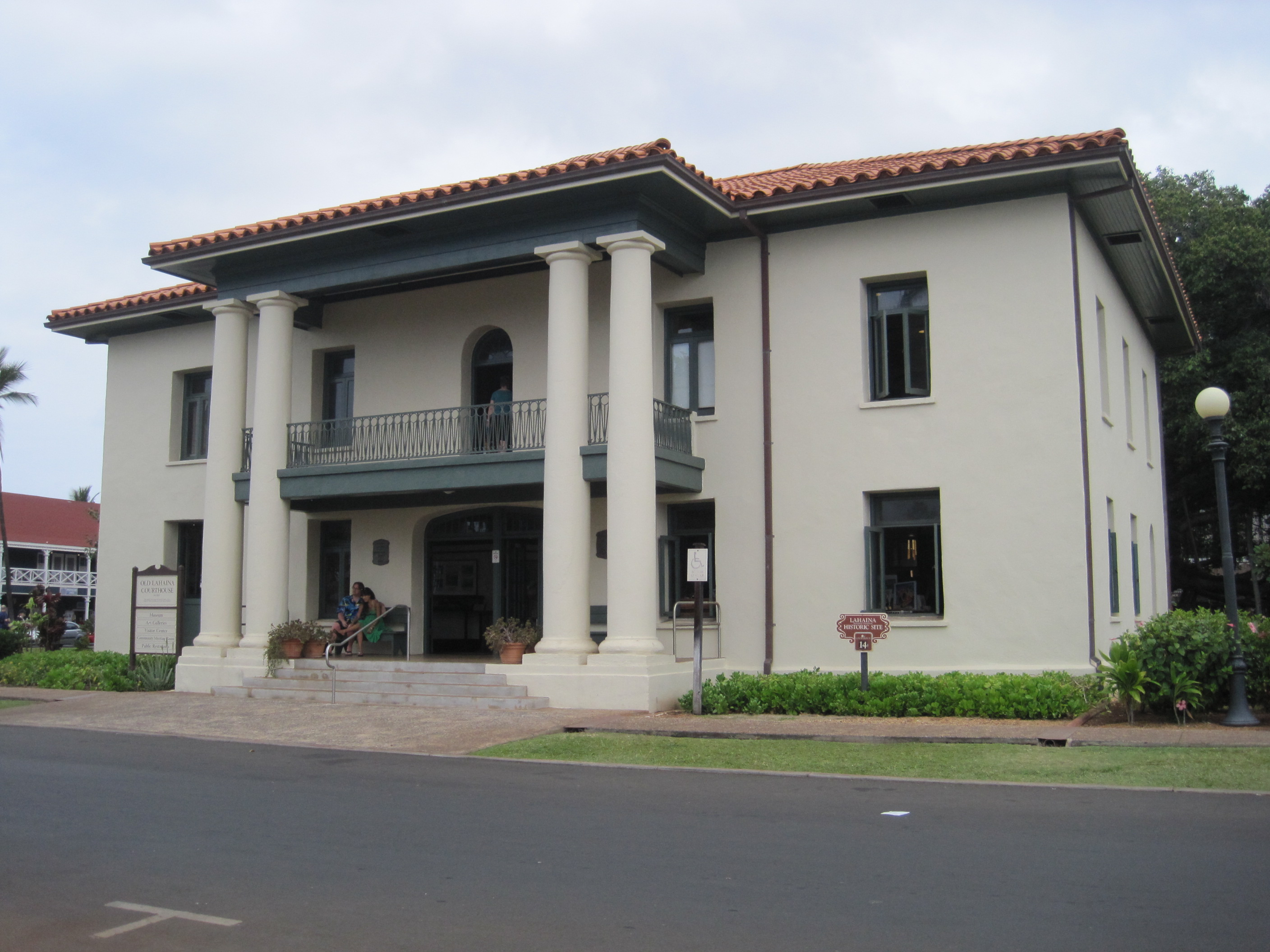
Old Lahaina Courthouse prior to being gutted by fire in 2023

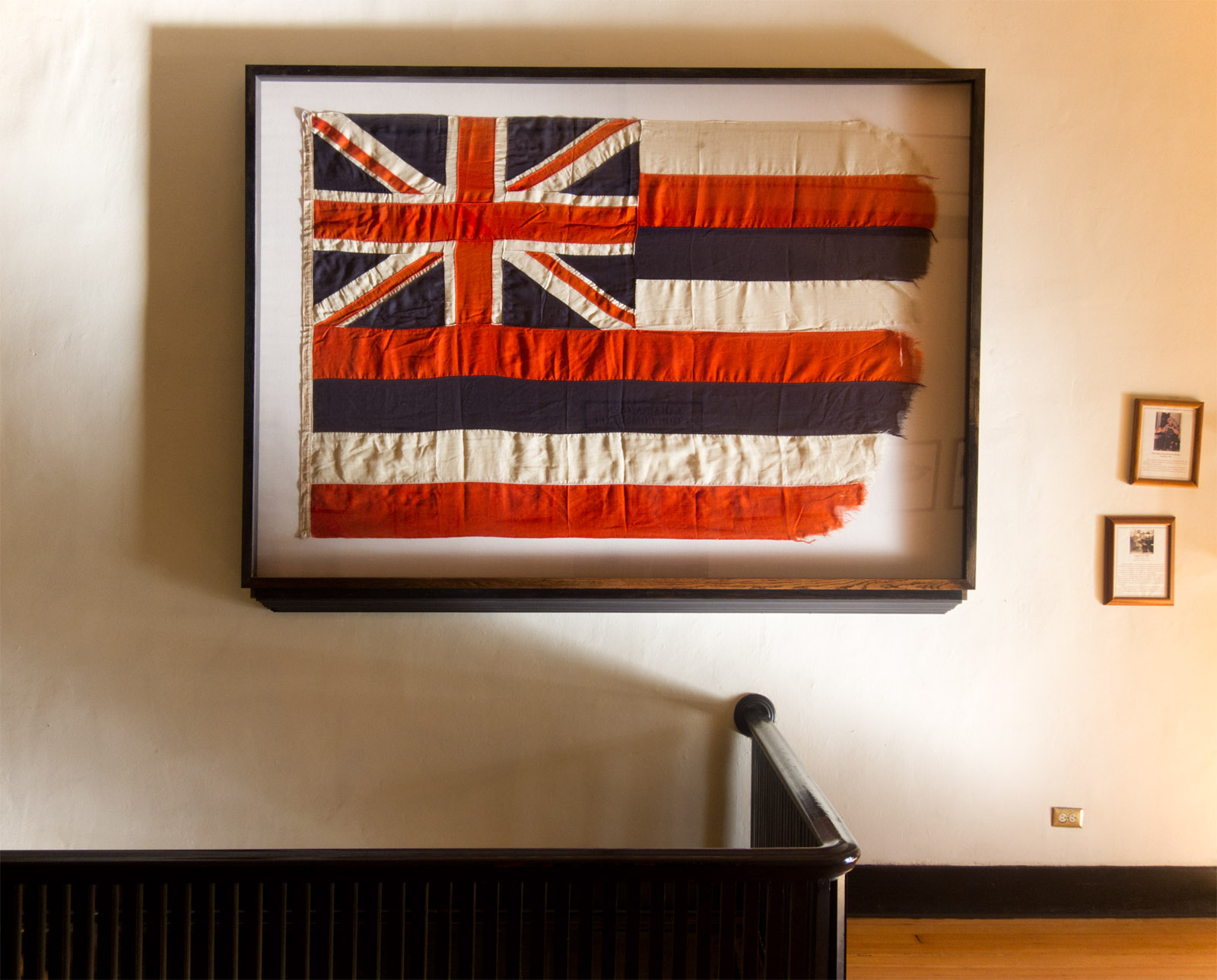
The last Flag of Hawaii to fly over the courthouse was on permanent display prior to its destruction in 2023

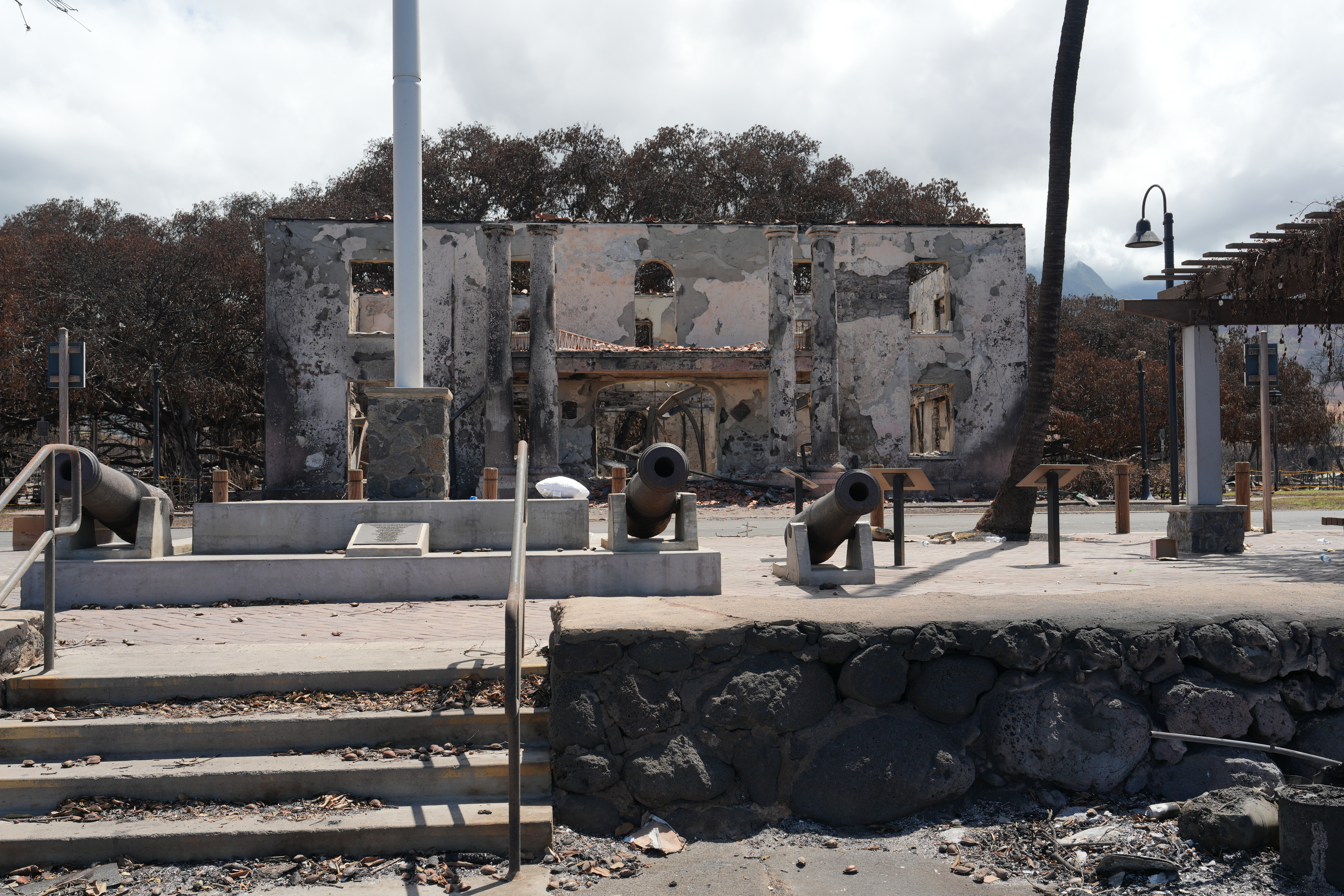
The courthouse after the fire

== Banyan tree ==
To memorialize the 50th anniversary of the first American Protestant mission in Lahaina, a banyan tree (Ficus benghalensis, Hawaiian: paniana) seedling was planted on April 24, 1873, in the courthouse square by sheriff William Owen Smith, who had received it as a gift from missionaries in India. The banyan, native to India, is one of 60 types of fig tree in the Hawaiian islands. The seedling was approximately 8 feet (2.4 m) high when it was planted; by 2005 it had grown to a height of 49.2 feet (15.0 m), had 16 trunks, and covered a circumference of 0.25 miles (0.40 km) within 0.66 acres (0.27 ha) of the park. It is currently the largest banyan tree in Hawaii, and one of the largest banyan trees in the United States. The tree faces several threats, including soil compaction from foot and vehicle traffic due to tourism and special events in the park, drought, and the interruption of irrigation due to courthouse renovation. New restrictions were imposed in 2000 after the health of the tree began to decline. Common myna birds (Acridotheres tristis) roost in the branches of the tree at sunset, causing a cacophony of bird cries as the evening approaches.

The tree suffered substantial damage from the 2023 wildfires. Approximately 40% of the tree had to be removed, in order to promote recovery in the healthy portions that remain. Extensive restoration efforts are ongoing to revive the tree's health and prepare it for the park's reopening, currently planned for late 2026.

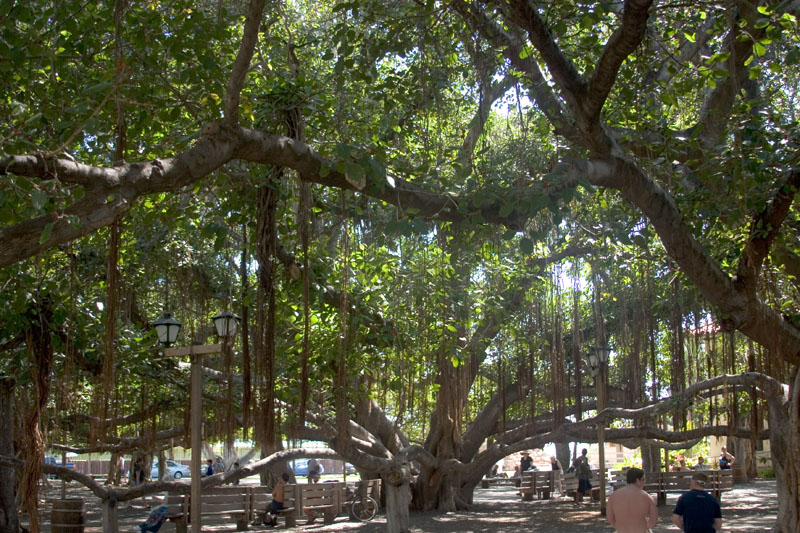
Central trunk of the banyan tree beneath the canopy

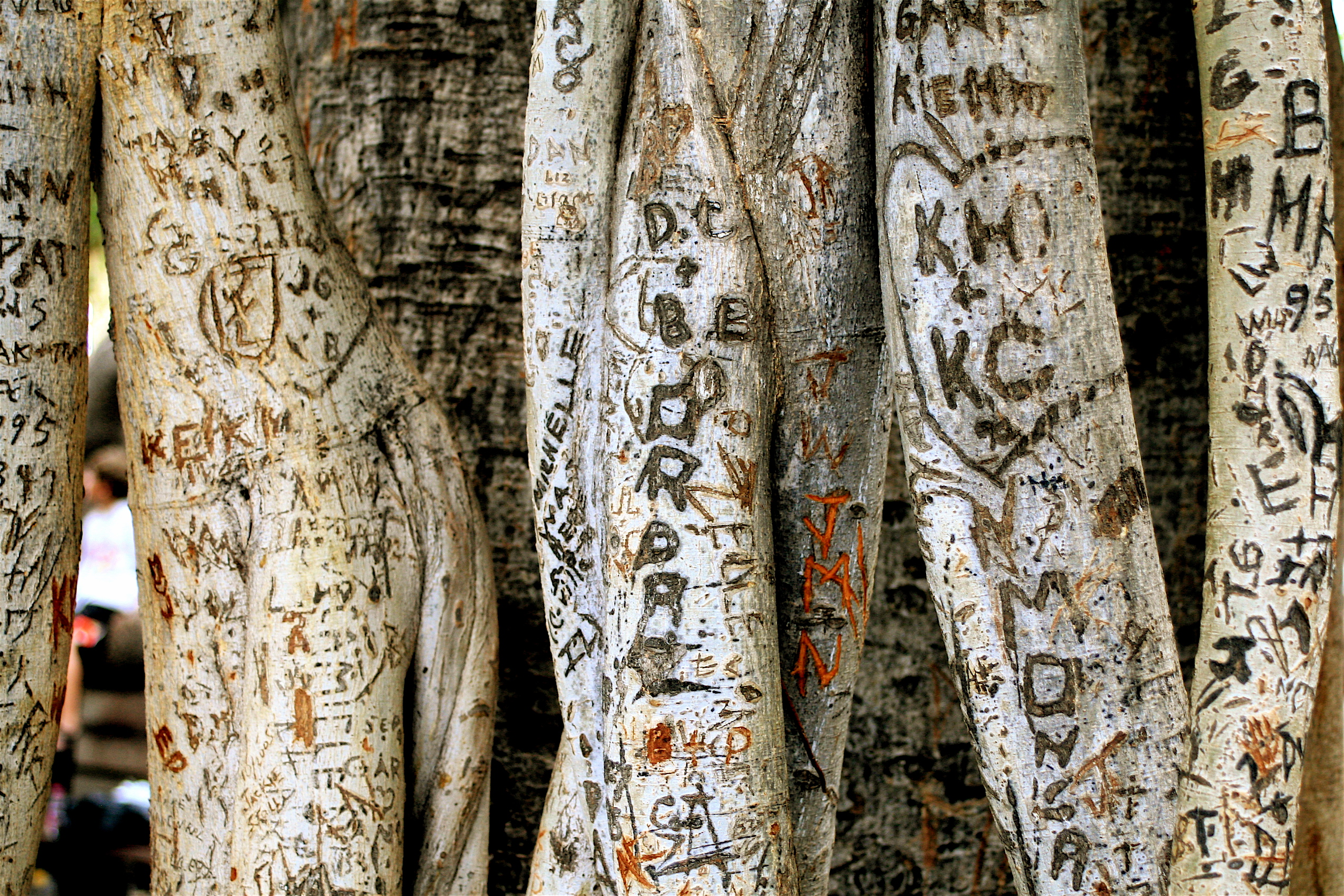
Tree bark carvings left by visitors

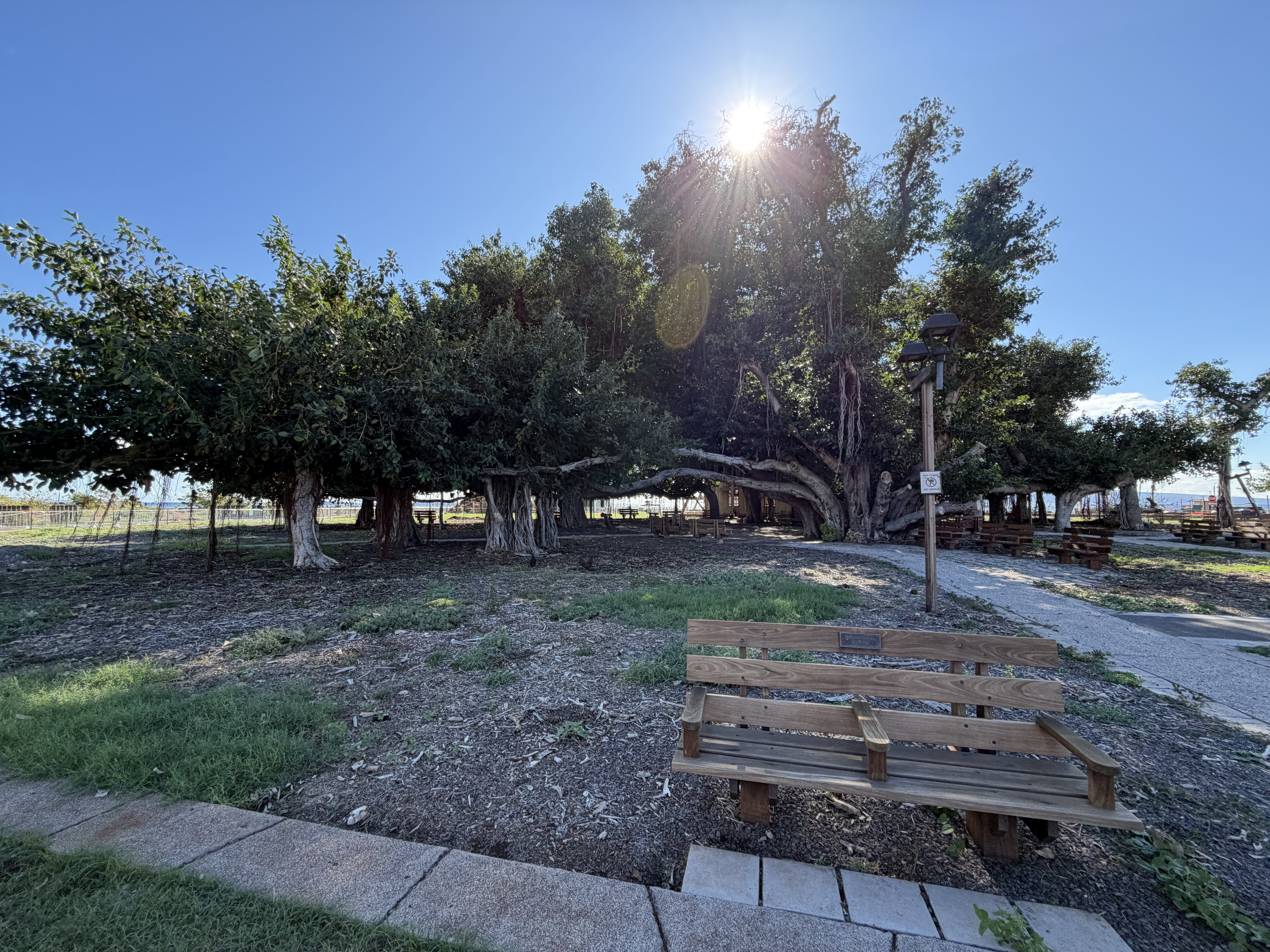
The banyan tree in February 2026, showing extent of post-fire trunk removal and canopy recovery.

== Administration, facilities, and events ==
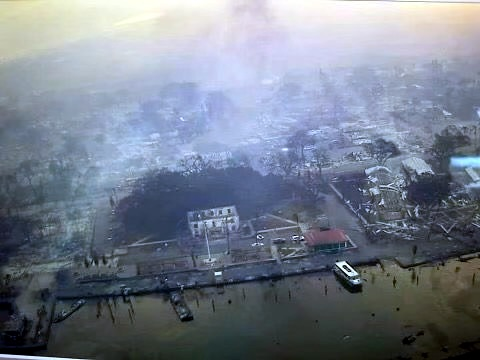
9 August 2023 view of Lahaina Banyan Court Park, still smouldering from the 8–9 August 2023 Hawaii wildfires

The park is administered by the Maui Parks and Recreation department and maintained by the nonprofit Lahaina Restoration Foundation. Limited public parking is available on Front, Hotel, and Canal Streets, with very limited parking on Wharf Street as it is generally reserved for tour buses. All Banyan Tree Park events are hosted by The Lahaina Town Action Committee, which is in charge of the Visitor Center, 2nd Friday, Heui Craft Fairs and all festivals throughout the year including Halloween. Halloween events in the park area, known as the "Mardi Gras of the Pacific", have long been a divisive issue between Maui County and the Cultural Resources Commission.

== Bibliography ==
- A Roving Printer. (1861). Life and Adventure in the South Pacific. New York: Harper and Brothers. OCLC 221632602
- Albers, D. Kahn, G. Swall-Bobay, L. (April 27, 2008). Our World: More than the light bulb Archived November 29, 2014, at the Wayback Machine. Naples Daily News. Retrieved November 19, 2014.
- Arista, N. (2009). Listening to Leoiki: Engaging Sources in Hawaiian history. Biography. Project Muse. (32) 1, 66–73.
- Atchison, M. (September 17, 2005). Maui town has solid roots. Toronto Star. ISSN 0319-0781
- Bradley, H. W. (1968) [1942]. The American Frontier in Hawaii: The Pioneers, 1780-1843. Gloucester: Peter Smith. [Stanford University Press]. OCLC 153832323
- Freidel, F. (1943). A Whaler in Pacific Ports, 1841-42. Pacific Historical Review. 12 (4), 380–390. (subscription required)
- Hurley, T. (April 22, 2001). There's life yet in the old banyan tree. The Honolulu Advertiser.
- Judd, Walter F. (1975). Palaces and Forts of the Hawaiian Kingdom: From Thatch to American Florentine. Palo Alto, CA: Pacific Books. ISBN 0870152165.
- Kamakau, S. M. (1992) [1961]. Ruling Chiefs of Hawaii. Honolulu: The Kamehameha Schools Press. p. 356. ISBN 0-87336-015-X.
- Kashay, J. F. (August 2008). Competing Imperialisms and Hawaiian Authority: The Cannonading of Lāhainā in 1827. Pacific Historical Review. University of California Press. 77 (3), 369–390. doi:10.1525/phr.2008.77.3.369 (subscription required).
- Kubota, G. T. (October 21, 2000b). Historic Lahaina banyan showing new growth: But experts still fear the long-term effects of a three-year drought. Honolulu Star-Bulletin.
- Kubota, G. T. (September 21, 2002). Diary is a letter from old Maui. Honolulu Star-Bulletin.
- Kubota, G. T. (August 7, 2004). Lahaina's famed banyan tree gets a rest. Honolulu Star-Bulletin.
- Kupau, S. (2001). Exploring Historic Lahaina. Honolulu: Watermark Publishing. ISBN 978-0-9705787-2-3.
- Loomis, I. (October 7, 2011a). Cultural panel 'frustrated'. The Maui News.
- Loomis, I. (October 23, 2011b). Suit seeks to stop Halloween celebration. The Maui News.
- Masudo, S. Holl, H. H. (1960). Map of Historic Sites of Lahaina, Maui. In Maui Historical Society's Lahaina Historical Guide. Tokyo: Charles E. Tuttle, Co. OCLC 7820308
- Maui Historical Society. (1971) [1961]. Lahaina Historical Guide. Tokyo: Charles E. Tuttle, Co. OCLC 7820308
- Maui Parks and Recreation. (2003). Lahaina Banyan Court Overview and Parking. County of Maui.
- Mills, P. R. (2002). Hawaii's Russian Adventure: A New Look at Old History. Honolulu: University of Hawaii Press. ISBN 0-8248-2404-0.
- "News from the Sandwich Islands. The New York Times. April 14, 1858.
- Nickerson, R. (1980) [1978]. Lahaina: Royal Capital of Hawaii. Honolulu: Hawaiian Service. ISBN 0-930492-03-X.
- Pukui, M. K. Elbert, S. H. (1986). Hawaiian Dictionary. Honolulu: University of Hawaiʻi Press. ISBN 0-8248-0703-0.
- Randall, C. E. Clepper, H. E. (1976). Famous and Historic Trees. American Forestry Association. OCLC 2594323
- Rockett, L. (October 19, 2000). Burials found on school campus. Lahaina News.
- Scott, S. (1991).Plants Introduced by Later Settlers. Plants and Animals of Hawaii. Bess Press, Inc. ISBN 978-0-935848-93-9.
- Speakman, C. E. (2001) (1978). Mowee: A History of Maui, the Magic Isle. Honolulu: Mutual Publishing. ISBN 1-56647-489-2.
- Smith, R. (1995). Hawaii: A Walker's Guide. Hunter Publishing, Inc. ISBN 978-1-55650-694-9.
- Taylor, A. P. (1929). Lahaina: The Versailles of Old Hawaii. Thirty-Seventh Annual Report of the Hawaiian Historical Society for the Year 1928. Honolulu: Hawaiian Historical Society. ISSN 0363-4760
- United States Department of the Interior. National Park Service. (1974) [1962]. Lahaina Historic District. National Register of Historic Places.
- What's new on Maui. Travel Weekly. NorthStar Travel Media. 63 (45). November 8, 2004.
- Wilkes, C. (1845). Chapter XXIX. Hawaiian Group, or Sandwich Islands. Narrative of the United States' Exploring Expedition. London: Whittaker and Co. OCLC 53616059
- Wise, A. W. (1849). Los Gringos; or, An Inside View of Mexico and California with Wanderings in Peru, Chile, and Polynesia. London: Richard Bently Publishers. OCLC 78302959
