= Lahaina Banyan Tree =

Historic banyan tree in Maui, Hawaii

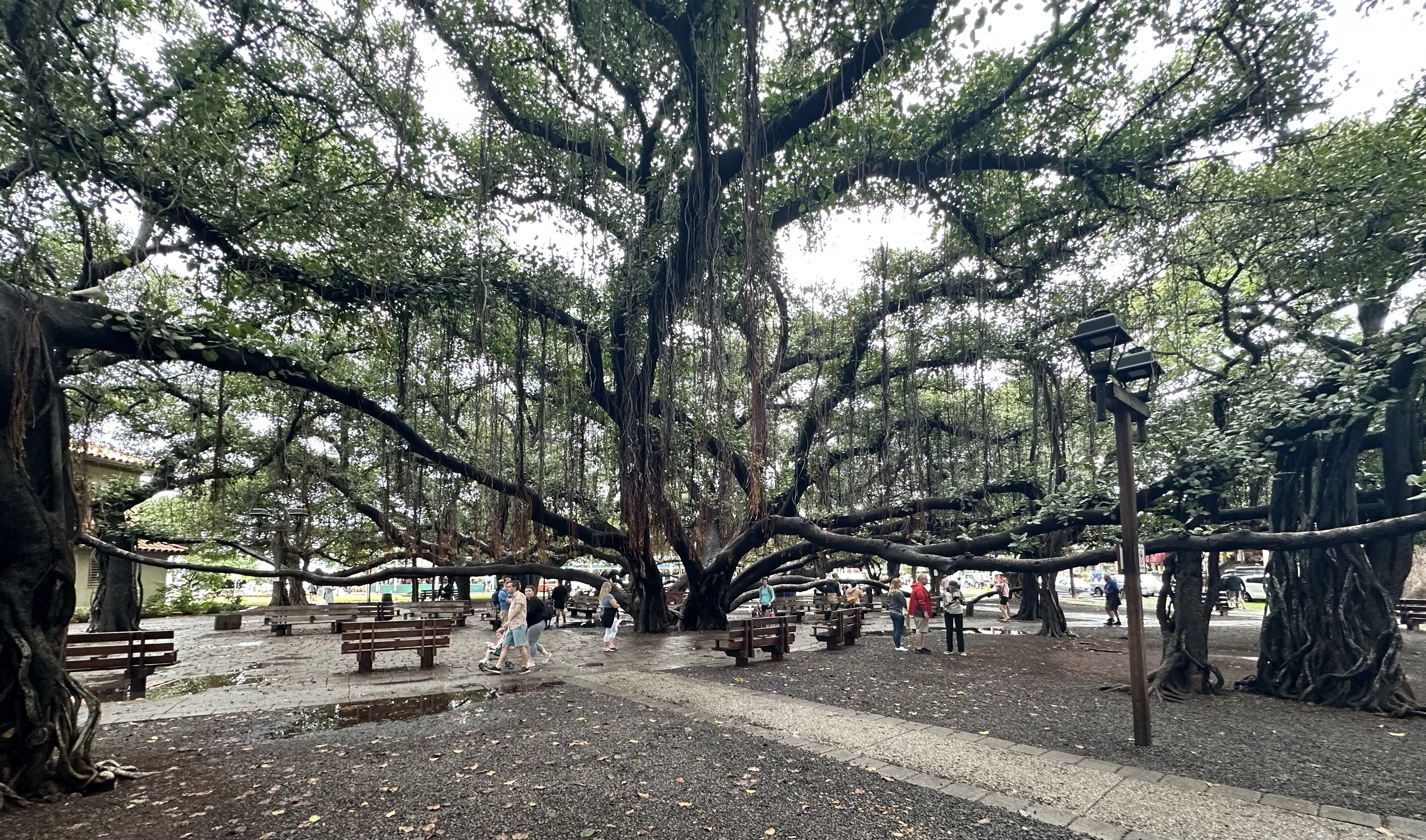
- Main trunk and canopy of the banyan tree prior to 2023 wildfire

- Location within Hawaii
- Species: Banyan (Ficus benghalensis)
- Location: Lahaina, Hawaii
- Coordinates: 20.886111°N 156.674722°W
- Date seeded: April 24, 1873

The Lahaina Banyan Tree is a banyan tree (Ficus benghalensis; known in Hawaiian as paniana) in Maui, Hawaii, United States. A gift from missionaries in India, the tree was planted in Lahaina on April 24, 1873, to mark the 50th anniversary of the arrival of first American Protestant mission. Covering 1.94 acres, the tree resides in Lahaina Banyan Court Park. A mere 8 feet (2.4 m) when planted, it grew to a height of about 60 feet (18 m) and rooted into 16 major trunks, apart from the main trunk, with the canopy spread over an area of about 0.66 acres (0.27 ha). It is considered the largest banyan tree in the state and the country. In April 2023, Lahaina held a birthday party to celebrate the Banyan Tree’s planting 150 years ago.

The 2023 Hawaii wildfires destroyed the town of Lahaina and severely damaged the tree. Disaster recovery efforts took place to determine the scope of the damage and to determine if the tree could be salvaged and restored. After fully examining the tree, arborists believe it has a reasonable chance of regeneration. To improve its chances, they have implemented a regimen of irrigation, compost, and soil aeration, with results expected in three to six months. County officials originally anticipated public access to the area around the tree to resume in late 2026, but following an arborist assessment the date has been pushed back to at least 2028.

== History ==
The banyan tree is located close to the port in the historical Lahaina town, which was the former capital of Hawaii. It is the oldest banyan tree in Hawaii.

The banyan tree, received as a gift by the Smith family in the 1870s, was planted on April 24, 1873, at Lahaina by William Owen Smith, the then sheriff of Lahaina. The tree was planted to mark the 50th anniversary of the arrival of the first Protestant mission in Maui; the mission had been invited to Maui by Queen Keōpūolani, wife of late King Kamehameha. Its extensive trunk and aerial root system covered 0.66 acres (0.27 ha), located in the Courthouse Square, which is renamed as the Banyan Tree Park covering 1.94 acres. It is not only the largest in Hawaii but also in the United States. The park is managed by the County of Maui and the Lahaina Restoration Foundation.

According to reports a royal ball was held under the tree in 1886 for King Kamehameha III on his birthday.

The Aloha Festivals Week has been held under this tree. The shade of the tree was used to shade vendors who held events approximately 36 weekends per year. At sunset, there was a riot of noise as the birds flew back into the tree to find the best branch to sleep on. There used to be a canal of water down one side of the tree, and even though the canal is now a street, it is still thought to be a source of water for the tree roots.

Aerial roots help support the tree's huge limbs. To encourage the roots to reach the ground faster, there were mayonnaise jars filled with water and tied to hang just below the roots. The roots wanted the water and it was thought that they did grow faster. Despite it appearing as many trees, it is actually one tree with many limbs that have grown new trunks beneath them.

=== 2023 wildfire and rehabilitation ===
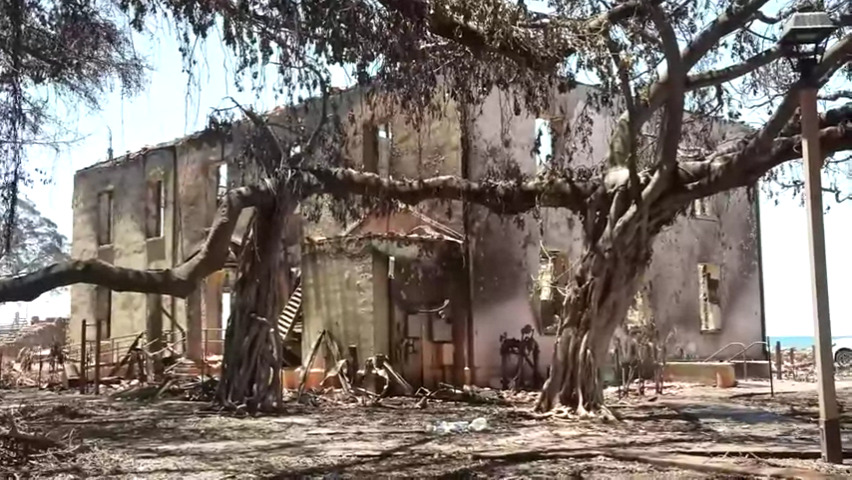
Damage from the 2023 Hawaii wildfires

The tree was seriously damaged when a series of wildfires broke out on the island of Maui in early August 2023. At the time of the fire it was more than 60 feet tall with multiple trunks and spanned almost an acre, due to the fire while some of the tree was charred, the intense heat dried out the tree, or desiccated it, causing about half the branches to die. The wind-driven fires prompted evacuations, caused widespread damage, and killed 102 people in the town of Lahaina. The proliferation of the wildfires was attributed to dry, gusty conditions created by a strong high-pressure area north of Hawaii and Hurricane Dora to the south.

Consulting Arborist Steve Nimz is monitoring the burned tree for signs of rehabilitation and renewed health. After the wildfire, a full inspection of the tree was completed, comprising the aerial roots and beneath the bark. Nimz discovered that the main trunks have live tissue, which is considered a good indicator of regeneration. He expects the wait and see period to last anywhere from three to six months. Current restoration efforts include a daily watering program provided by water trucks with hoses, and the addition of a two-inch layer of compost and soil aeration. "Normally if you touch or cut into a banyan tree, you’re just going to see that sap oozing out really fast," Nimz told The Maui News. "There was sap where I cut in on the top and all these areas, but it wasn’t proliferous like it would be on a really healthy tree. But it’s there. What I am saying is that these trees are resilient. With everybody’s love and everybody here, we want to see the tree make it. It’s up to the tree right now."

On September 19, the Hawaii Department of Land and Natural Resources reported a fresh sprout of leaves out of the tree, indicating the first signs of possible recovery. In November 2023, it was reported by arborists that while part of the tree only had high heat from the flames, which killed the leaves but not the branches or trunk, about 15–20% of the tree was too badly burned and would need to be trimmed back. Stepping stones around the base of the tree were removed to allow more nutrients to penetrate the soil, and fifteen solar-powered sensors were attached to the tree in order to monitor it.

In March 2024, roughly a third of the tree was removed. These dead portions were removed in order to encourage the tree to redirect its healing efforts towards the portions of the tree that were recovering. In addition, efforts were underway to eventually restore the original footprint of the tree via air layering.

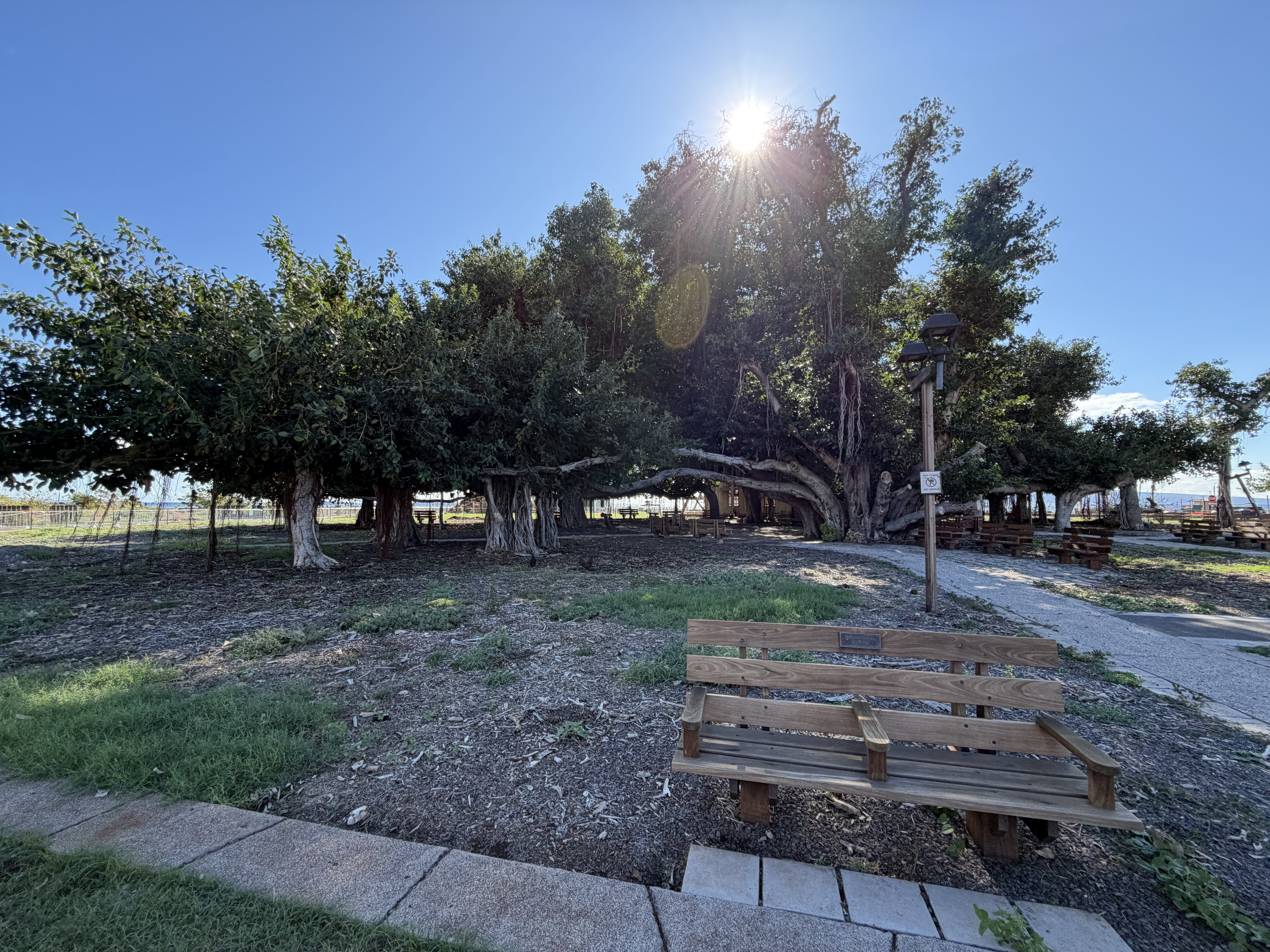
The banyan tree in February 2026, showing extent of post-fire trunk removal and canopy recovery.

By August 2025, the Banyan Court Park surrounding the tree had not re-opened to the public due to infrastructure concerns. However, the Lahaina Restoration Foundation had installed 29 benches around the tree; members of the public are able to sponsor a bench for $5,000, with a plaque identifying which bench was theirs. The tree was described as very, very healthy by Duane Sparkman, an arborist committee chair and Treecovery Lahaina president that same month, stating that there were aerial roots coming down from branches almost 20 feet up in the air and fruit on the tree. Sparkman continued that some of the larger horizontal limbs still needed some structural support, with concerns about safety for those on the ground delaying the re-opening of the park.

By March 2026 the park remains off-limits to visitors, with an extensive assessment of the tree's health by arborists from Maui and O'ahu scheduled in May after fungus was found in a branch that had snapped in early February. The test will include using weighted ropes to test the amount of tension branches can withstand, and puncturing the tree with stainless steel spikes to see if it produces sap and if there is a functioning cambium.

Following the May 2026 assessment, it was decided in August 2026 that Banyan Court Park will remain fenced off until at least 2028, due to fears of woodboring beetles or twig borers damaging the interior heartwood, rendering the tree fragile and dangerous to the public. It was also noted that the upper canopy is regrowing much slower than the lower canopy. Arborist Duane Sparkman says that by avoiding soil compaction from human interaction, the banyan tree's roots will be able to extract and distribute nutrient throughout the tree faster; and preventing people from climbing the tree will allow it to set more aerial roots into the soil.

== Features ==
The banyan tree or Ficus benghalensis is from India, and it is known for unusual growth of its roots. The roots descend or sprout from the branches into aerial roots towards the ground where they form new trunks. This results in the growth of many trunks around the main trunk. The banyan, native to India, is one of 60 types (out of reported 1,000 species in the world) of fig trees found throughout Hawaii. The trees are tall and “grow into mazes of additional trunks; in Lahaina, the tree covers an area of over half an acre. The banyan tree in Lahaina, when planted, was a sapling of 8 feet (2.4 m) height. Over the years it has grown to a height of over 60 feet (18 m) and spread into 16 major trunks, apart from the main trunk forming a large canopy of providing shade to the people from the blazing sun of Lahaina; it was intended as a part of a park. The growth of the roots was facilitated by the local Japanese gardening community, by hanging lanterns filled with water at suitable aerial roots. It is one of the sixty fig tree species in Hawaii, and is said to be the largest tree both in Hawaii and in the United States. It has a circumference of about one-fourth of a mile, and about a thousand people could congregate under it. A sight to watch at dusk time is the congregation of birds such as common myna birds (Acridotheres tristis), which roost in the branches of the tree for the night, causing a cacophony of bird cries.

== Conservation ==
The tree has been subject to severe stress due to drought conditions, soil compaction from foot and vehicle traffic in the park, and also due to developmental activities in the vicinity. As a result, restrictions have been imposed on plying vehicles under the tree. Its sustenance has been ensured by the Lahaina Restoration Foundation by installing an irrigation system in the park.

== Gallery ==
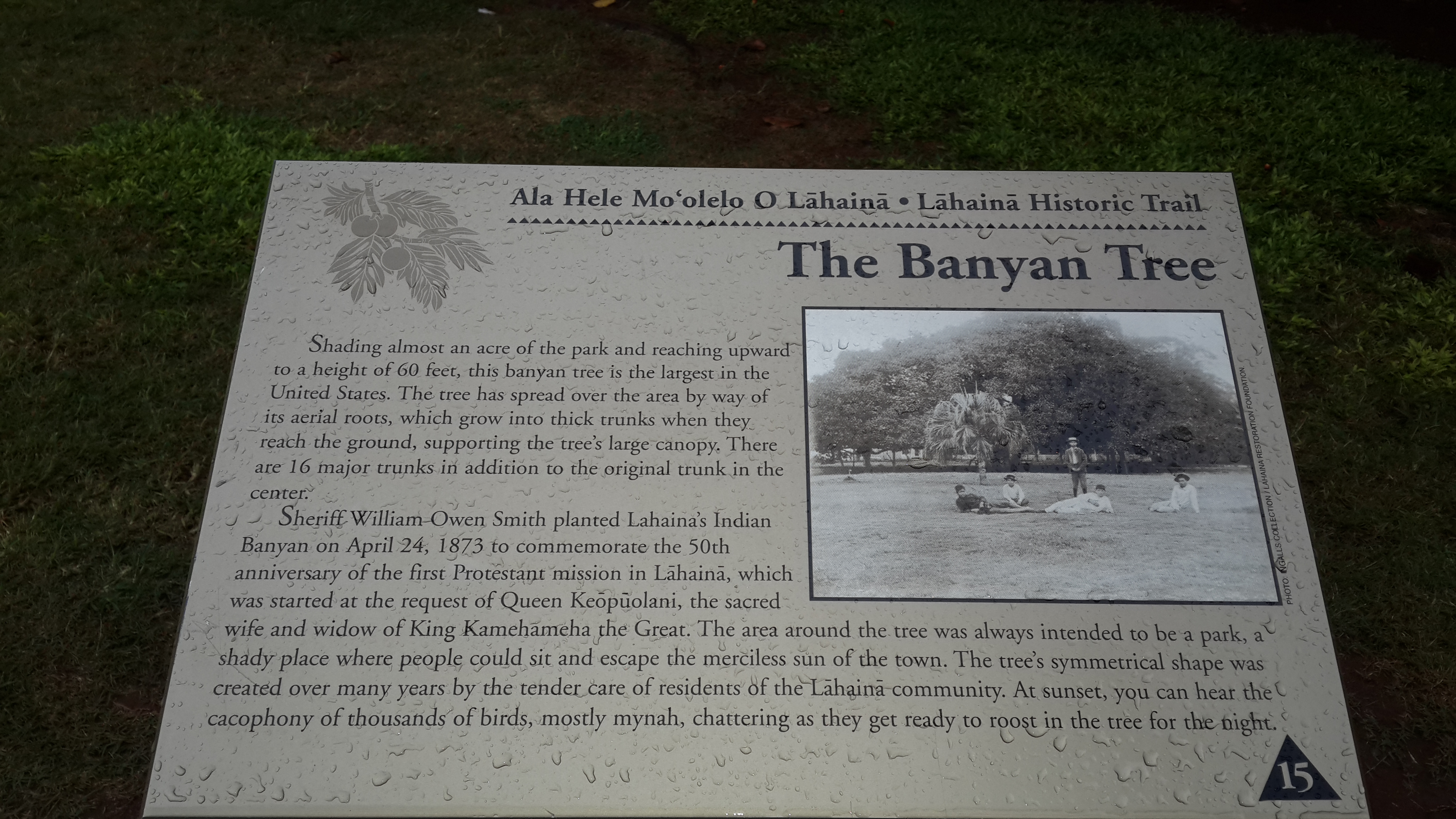
Information plaque detailing the history of the tree

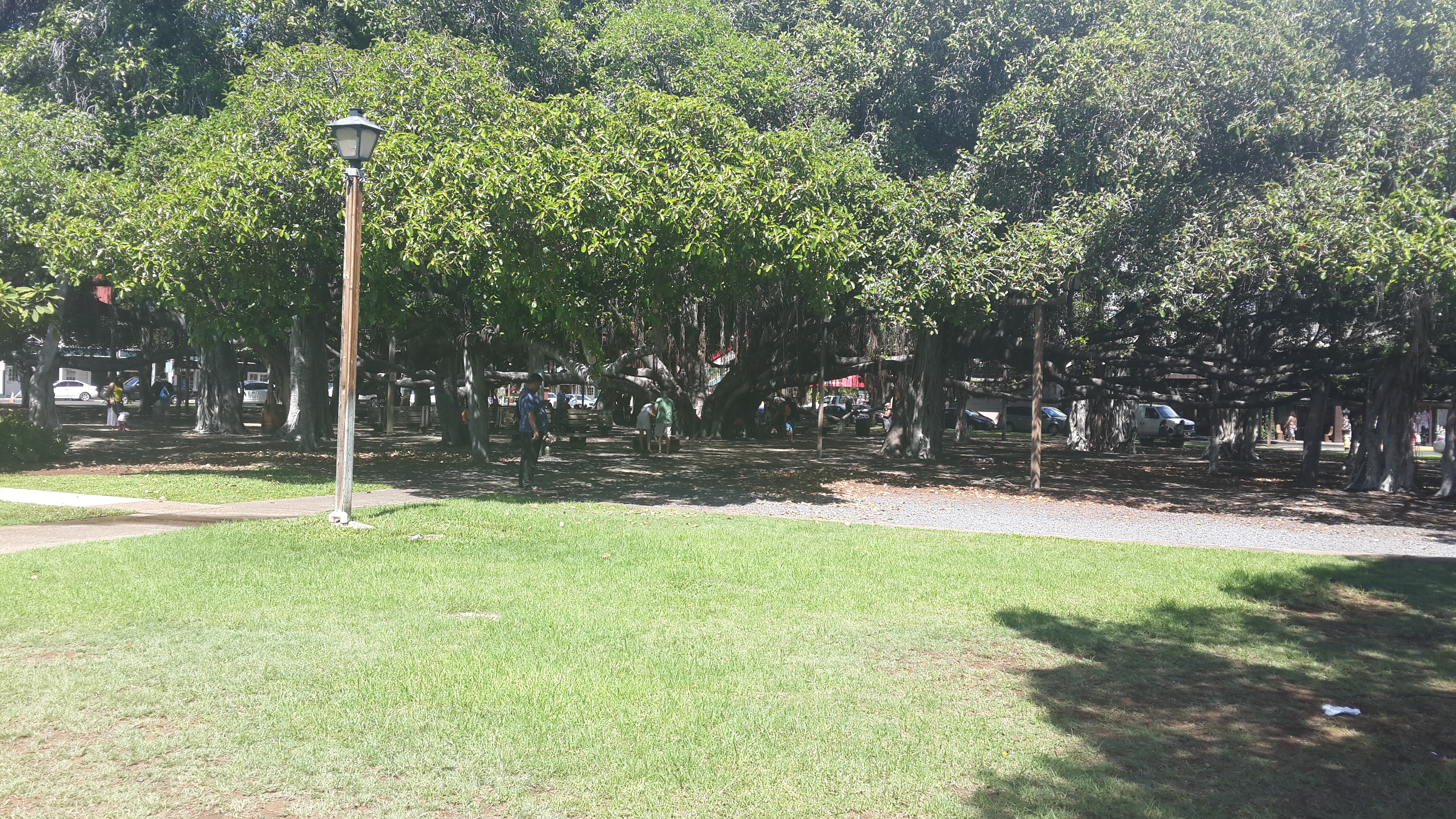
Full view of the banyan tree, with 16 secondary trunks spanning over 0.66 acres of land

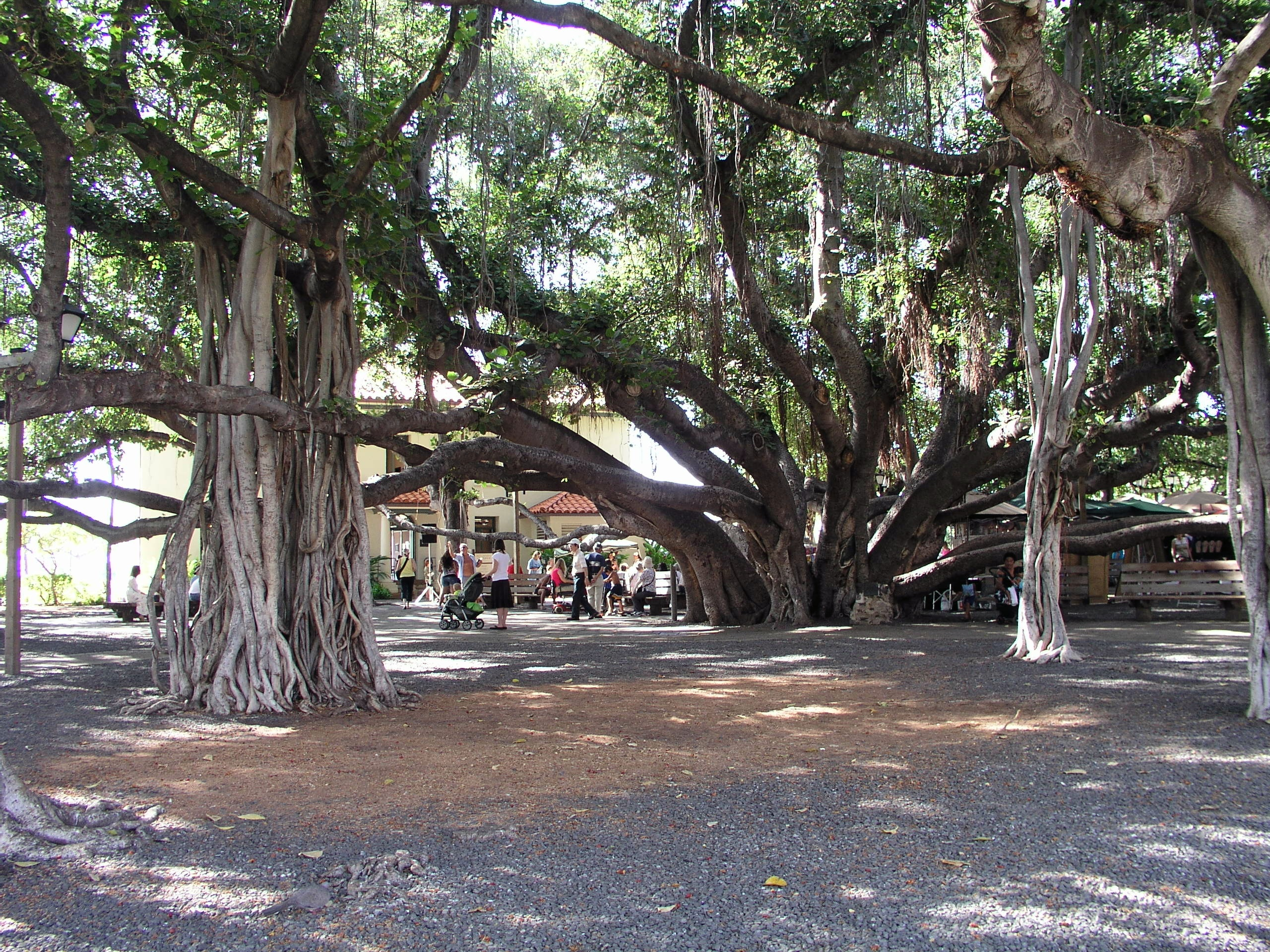
Close-up of main trunk

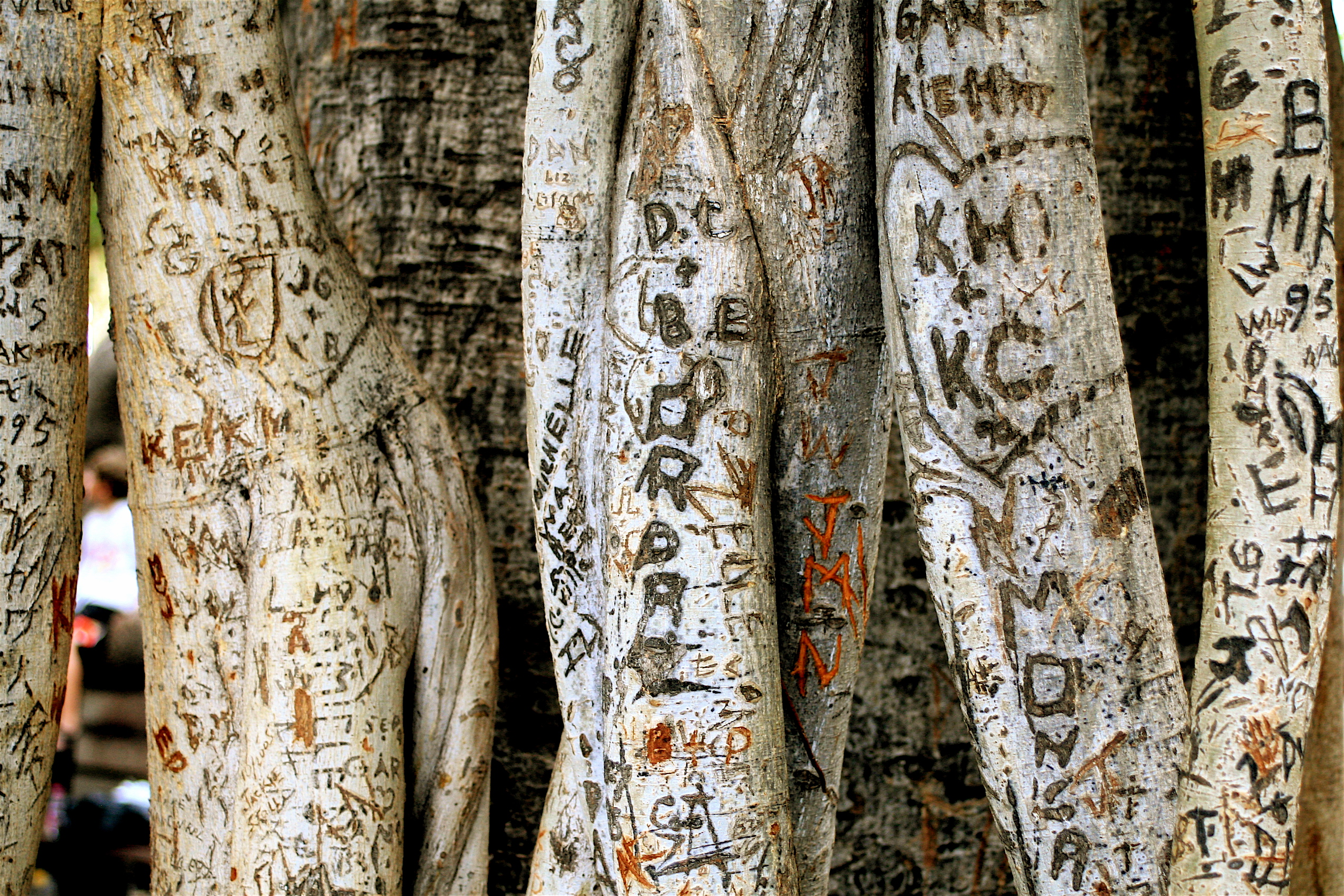
Graffiti on the trunks of the tree

== See also ==
- List of individual trees

== Bibliography ==
- Legarde, Lisa; Foster, Jeanette (1996). Frommer's Maui, with the Best Beaches, Shopping and Dining. John Wiley & Sons, Incorporated. ISBN 978-0-02-860905-8.
- Scott, Susan (January 1, 1991). Plants and Animals of Hawaii. Bess Press. p. 53. ISBN 978-0-935848-93-9.
