= Lahaina Heritage Museum =

Museum located in Lahaina, Maui

Coordinates: 20.8717°N 156.6778°W

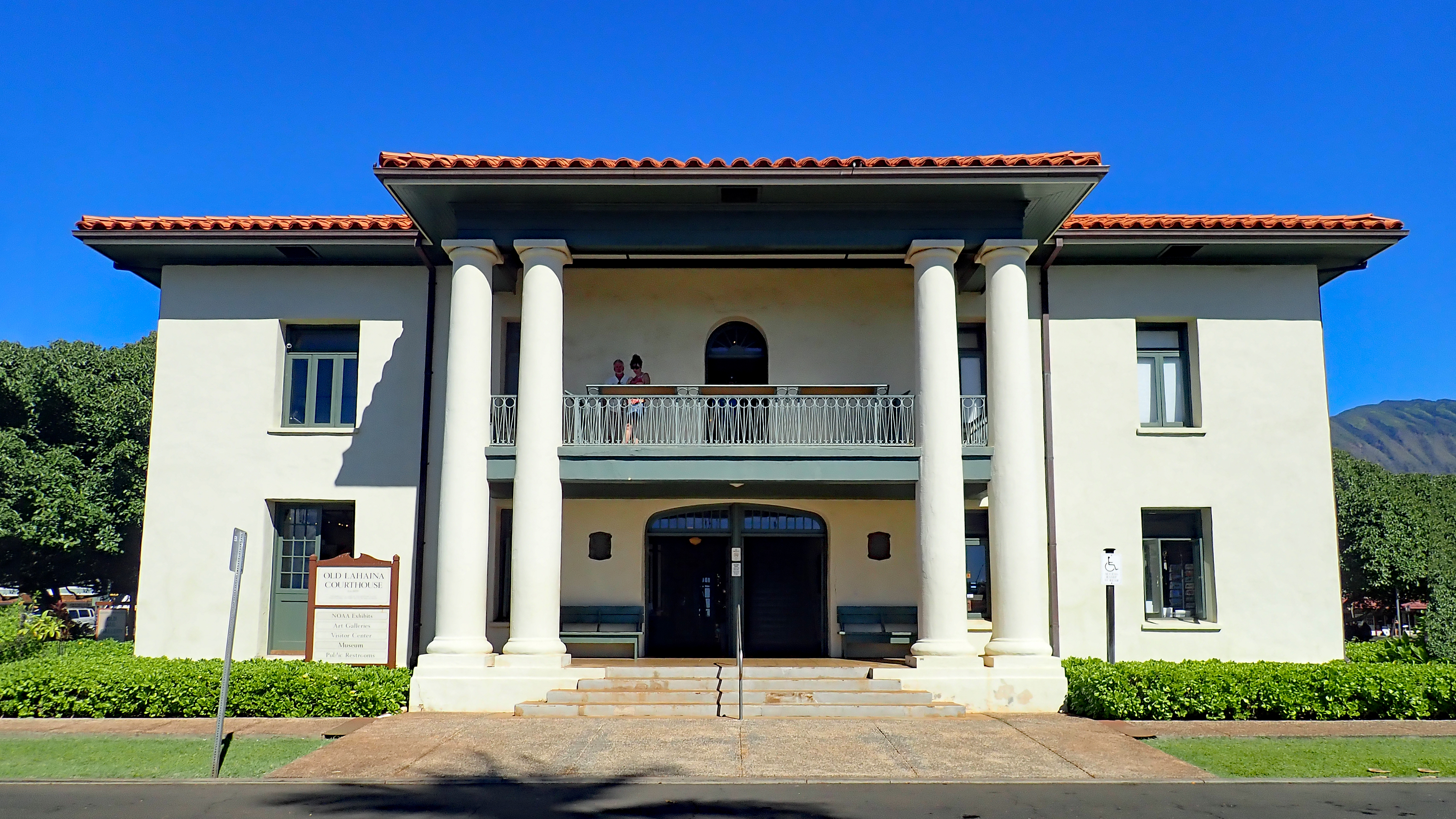
- Old Lahaina Courthouse, including the museum located on the second floor

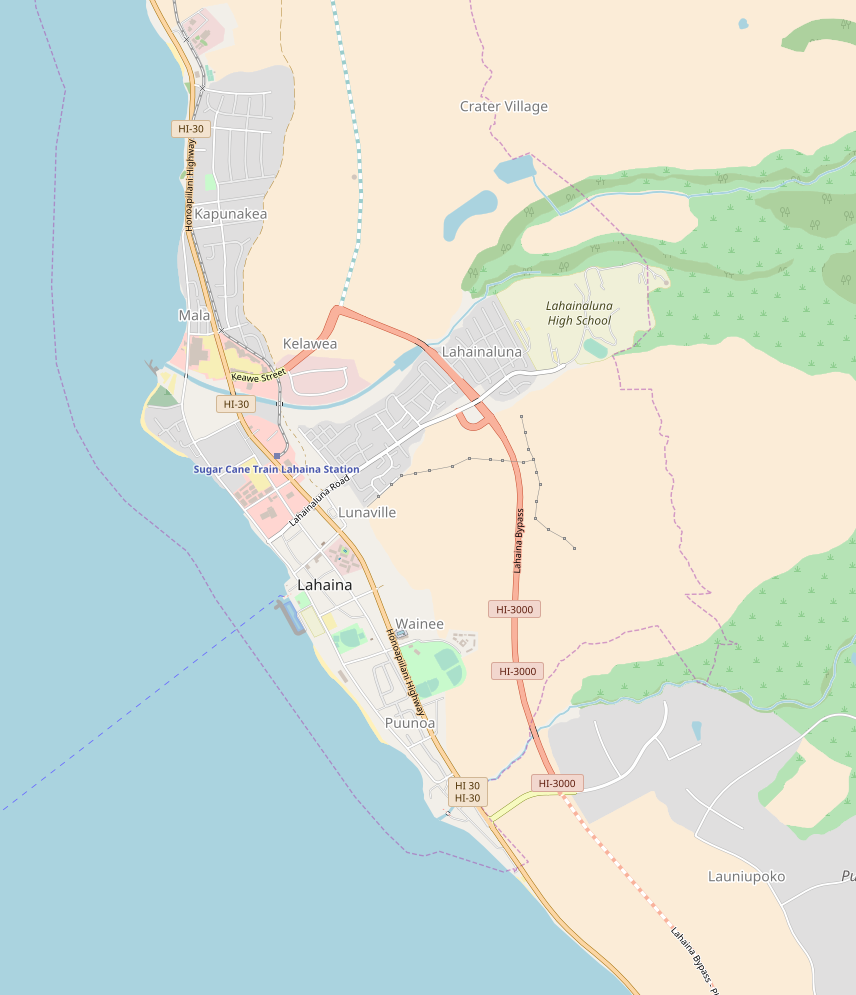
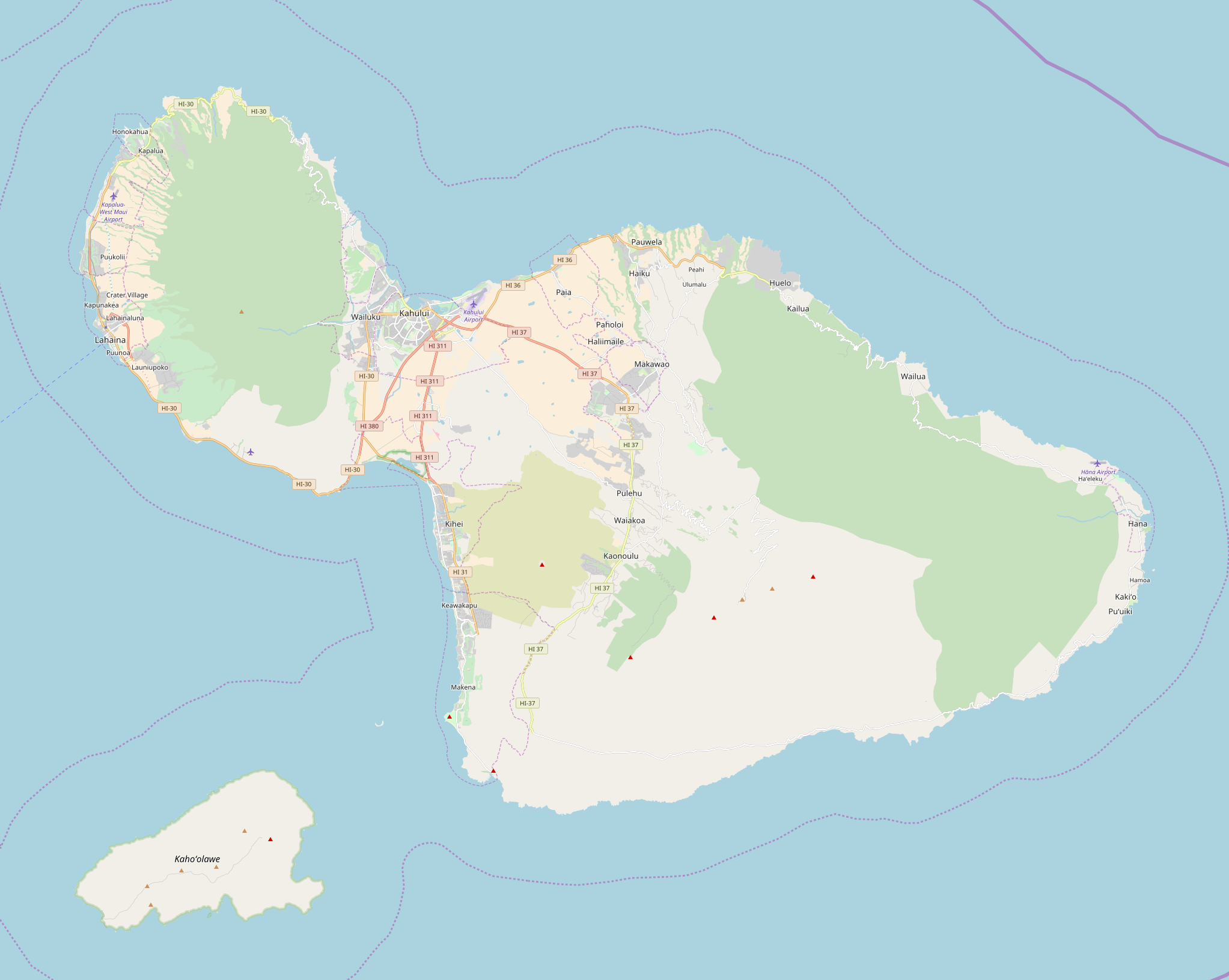
- Location within Lahaina, Hawaii Location within Maui Location within Hawaii
- Established: 2004
- Location: Lahaina, Maui, Hawaii, United States
- Type: Heritage museum, history museum
- Website: Lahaina Heritage Museum

The Lahaina Heritage Museum was a heritage museum and history museum located in Lahaina, Maui, Hawaii. It was a part of the Old Lahaina Courthouse on the second floor, having opened in 2004, years after the courthouse was restored yet again in 1990.

In August 2023, the museum was destroyed by the 2023 Hawaii wildfires, as well as the entirety of the Old Lahaina Courthouse. Documents were saved, as they were digitized online prior to the wildfire, protecting them for future generations. Artifacts and other objects were likely destroyed in the blaze.

== Exhibits and attractions ==
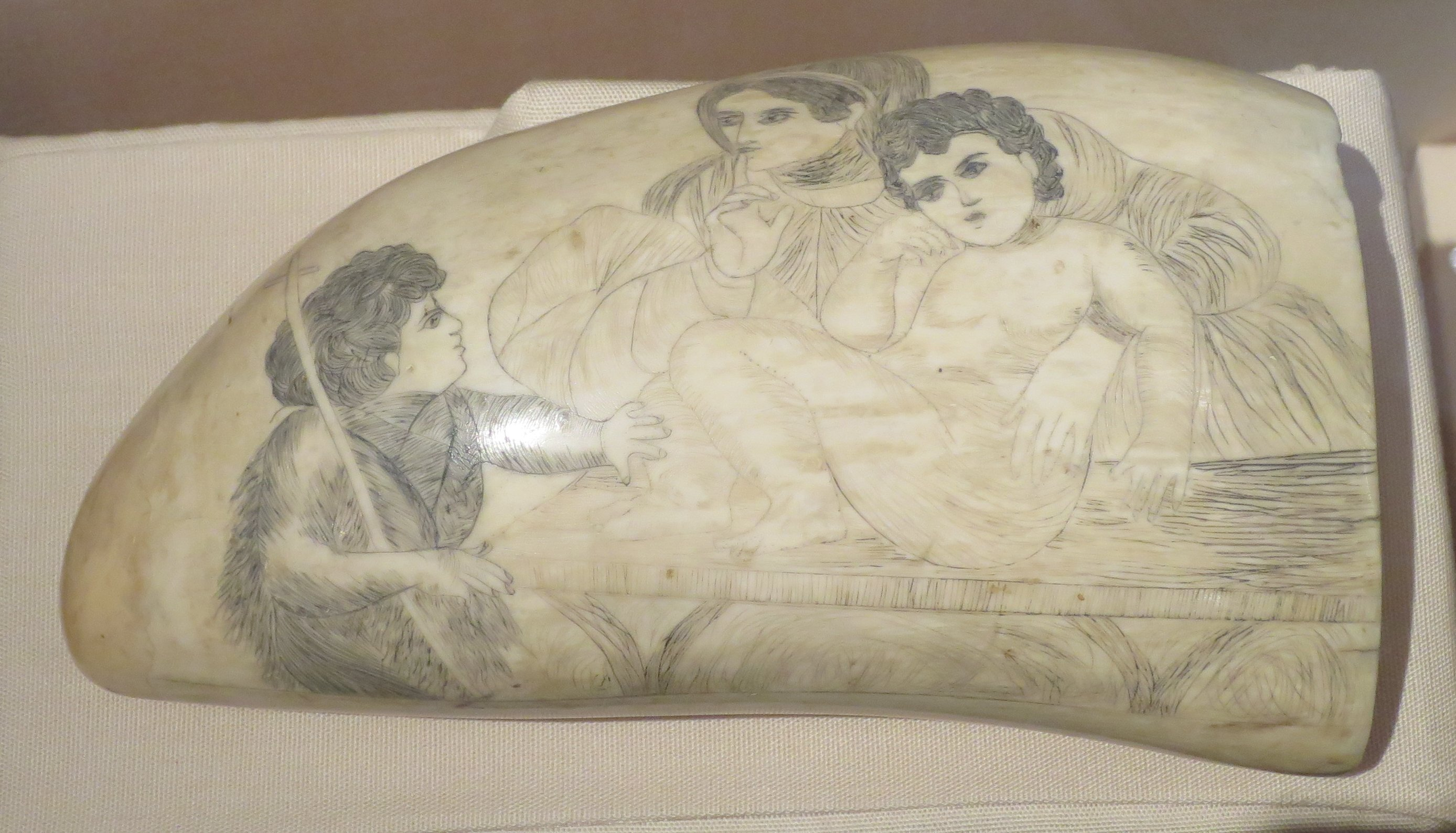
A scrimshaw sperm whale (Physeter macrocephalus) tooth at the museum.

The Lahaina Heritage Museum featured artifacts, historical and cultural, from pre-contact periods to the missionary, whaling, plantation, and monarchy periods. Notable artifacts included the 1898 Kingdom of Hawaii flag, previously hung on top of the courthouse (later moved to above the stairwell), sling stones made from volcanic rock used in early Hawaiian warfare during the pre-contact time, and other related artifacts such as weapons, spears, harpoons, and stone tools. The "Always Lahaina" exhibit detailed the local history of Lahaina. Another exhibit, "Lahaina's Whaling Days & Whales Today", contained valuable tools, whaling artifacts, and documents. The prior exhibit also had whale scrimshaw teeth (scrimshaw is carved or engraved ivory emphasized with black pigment) loaned from residents and local merchants, and Hawaiian Islands Humpback Whale National Marine Sanctuary photographs, taken by a National Geographic photographer. Videos and a touch-screen kiosk were also incorporated into the same exhibit for better explanation and viewing.

The Lahaina Heritage Museum also possessed black and white photographs of the town (specifically a census-designated place) from the early 1900s.

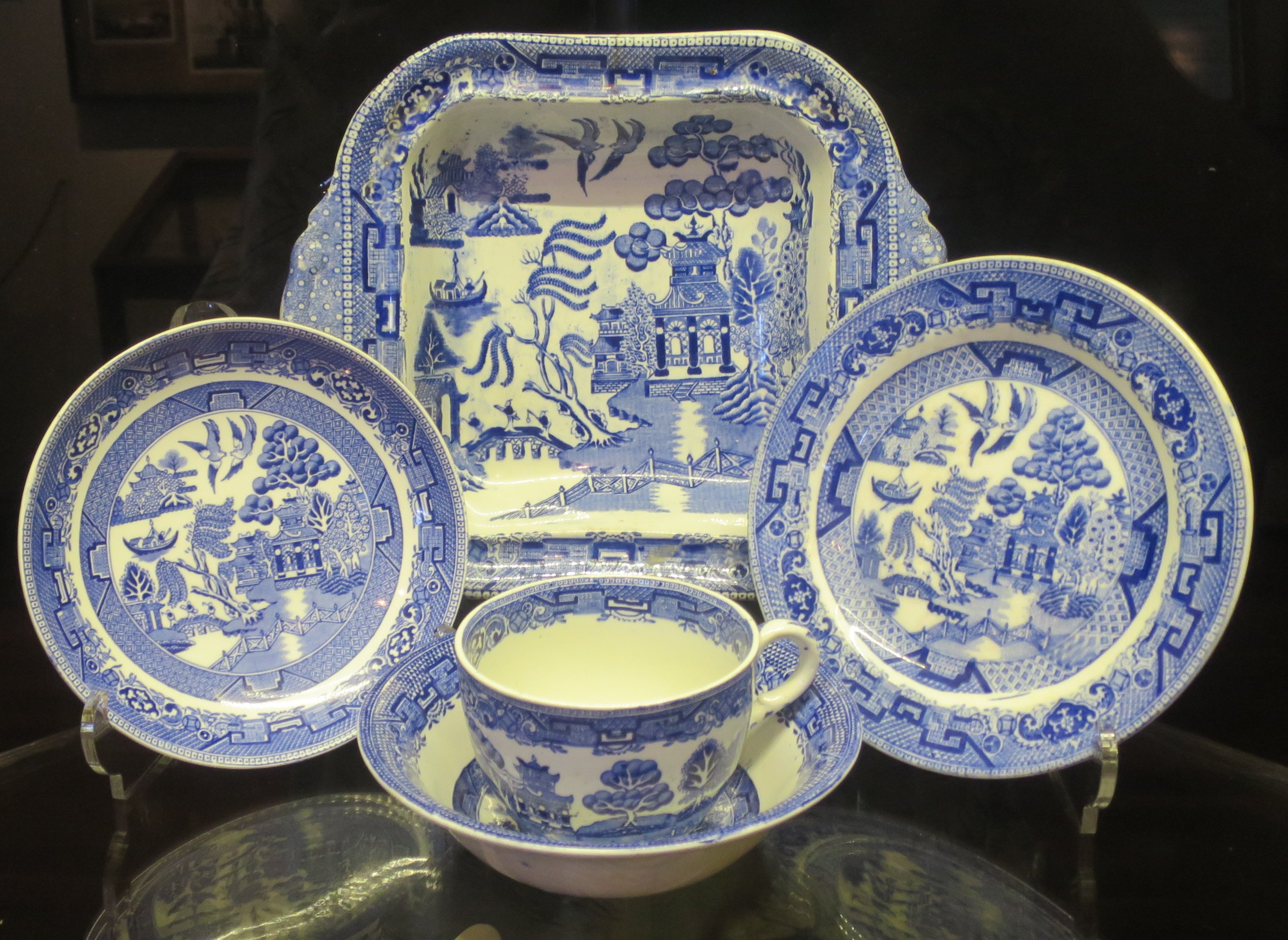
Blue Willow china (ca. late 1800s) at the museum.

A large topographical relief map, 8 x 5 ft (2.4 x 1.5 m) across, three dimensional, of Maui was present, with lighting when touched. It was displayed in a koa (Acacia koa) wood display table or cabinet.

Display cases for artifacts, recordings, and the video (movie) theater were funded by the National Marine Sanctuary Foundation, the wing of the National Oceanic and Atmospheric Administration (NOAA).

== Admission ==
The Lahaina Heritage Museum offered free admission, with opening hours (self-guided) from 10 am to 4 pm on a daily basis.

== Tours ==
The Lahaina Heritage Museum offered guided tours before the fire, listed in the following schedule:

- 10 am – The Ocean, Voyaging and Ancient Hawaiian Society
- 11 am – Master Crafts, Essential Plants and Daily Hawaiian Life
- 12 pm – The Hawaiian Nation, Western Arrival, Whaling & Plantation Eras

The tours were given every Wednesday, beginning at the mouth of the courthouse stairs, on the first floor.

== Gallery ==
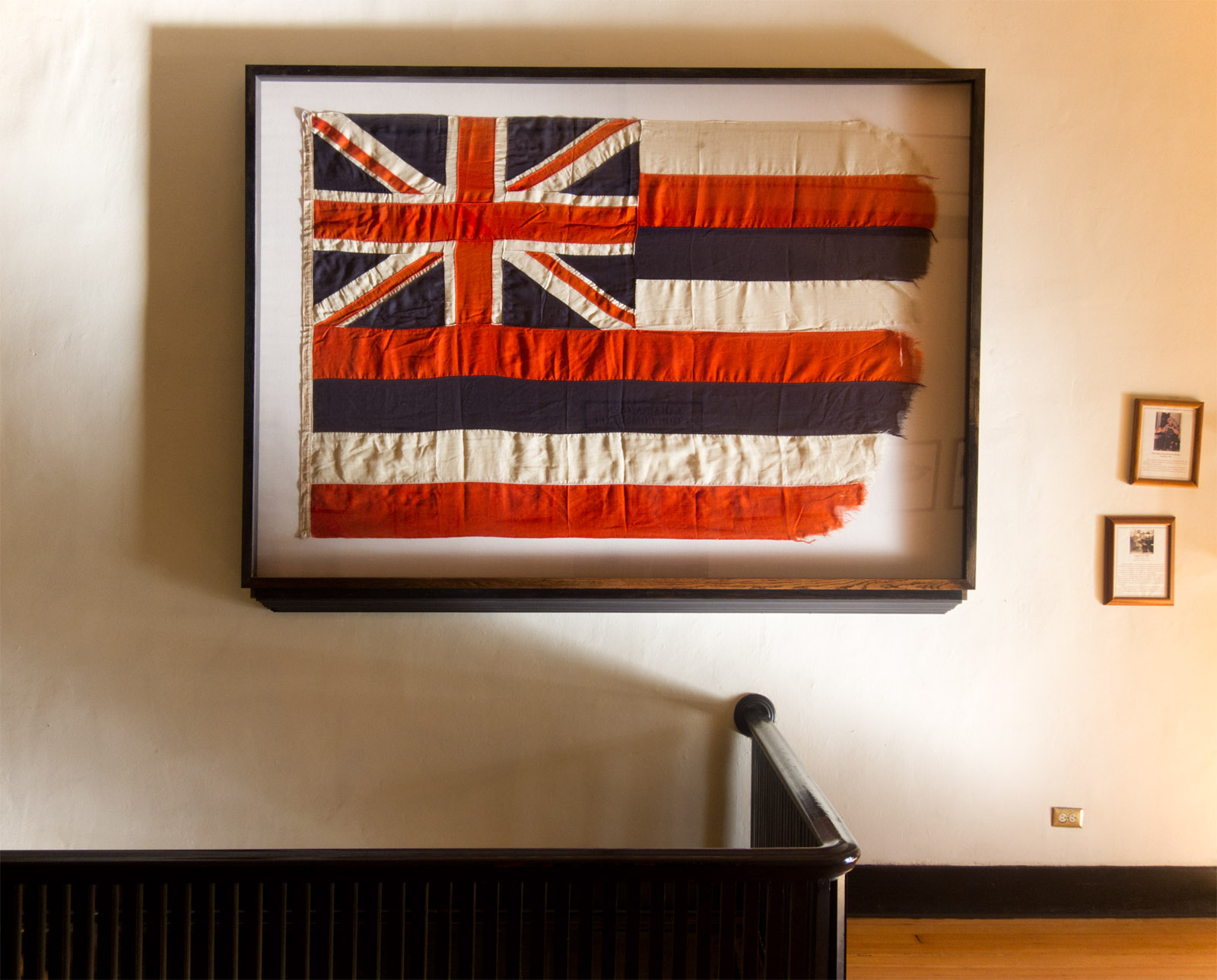
The 1898 Kingdom of Hawaii flag on display.

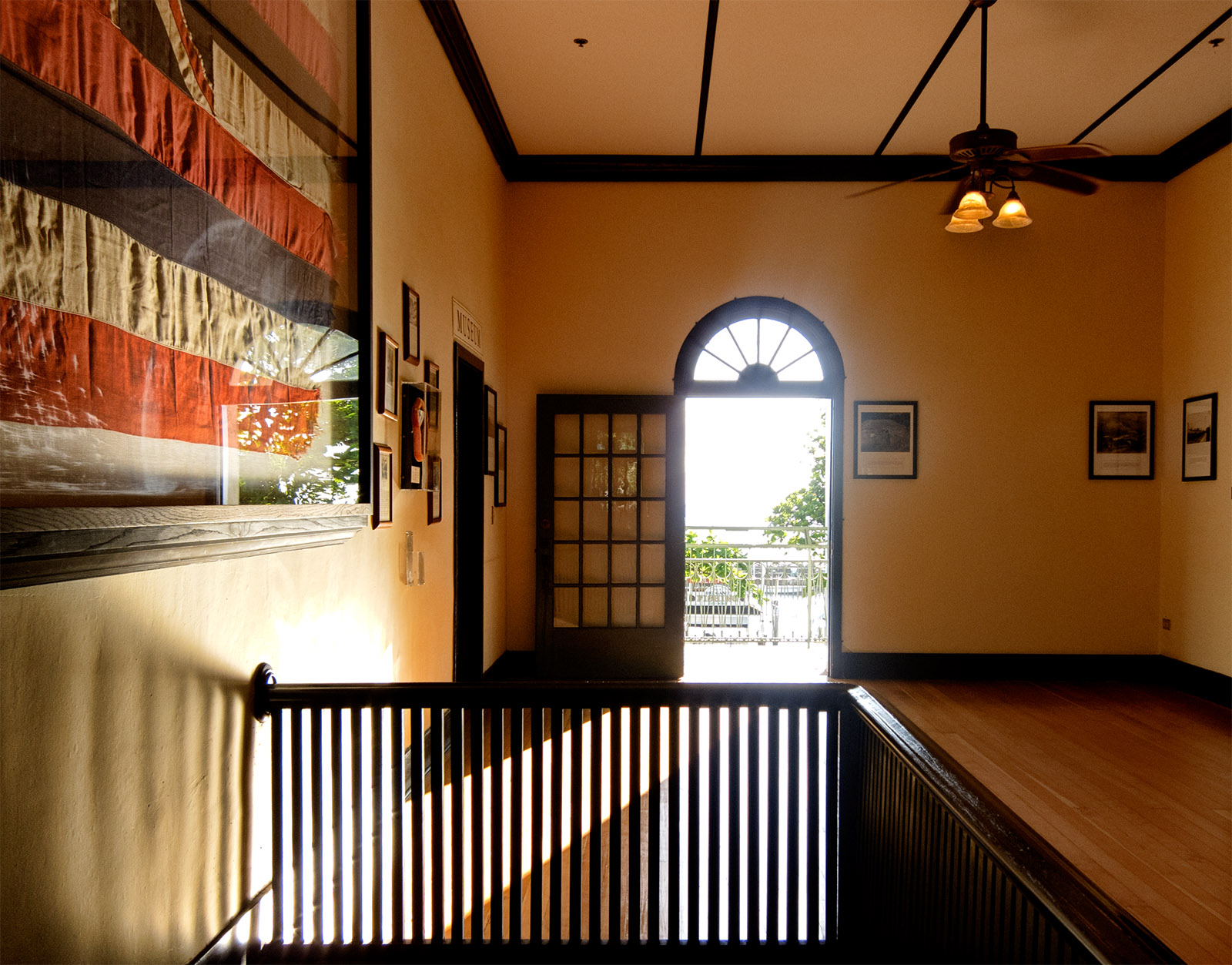
The second floor of the courthouse, as seen from the staircase, showing a portion of the 1898 Kingdom of Hawaii flag.

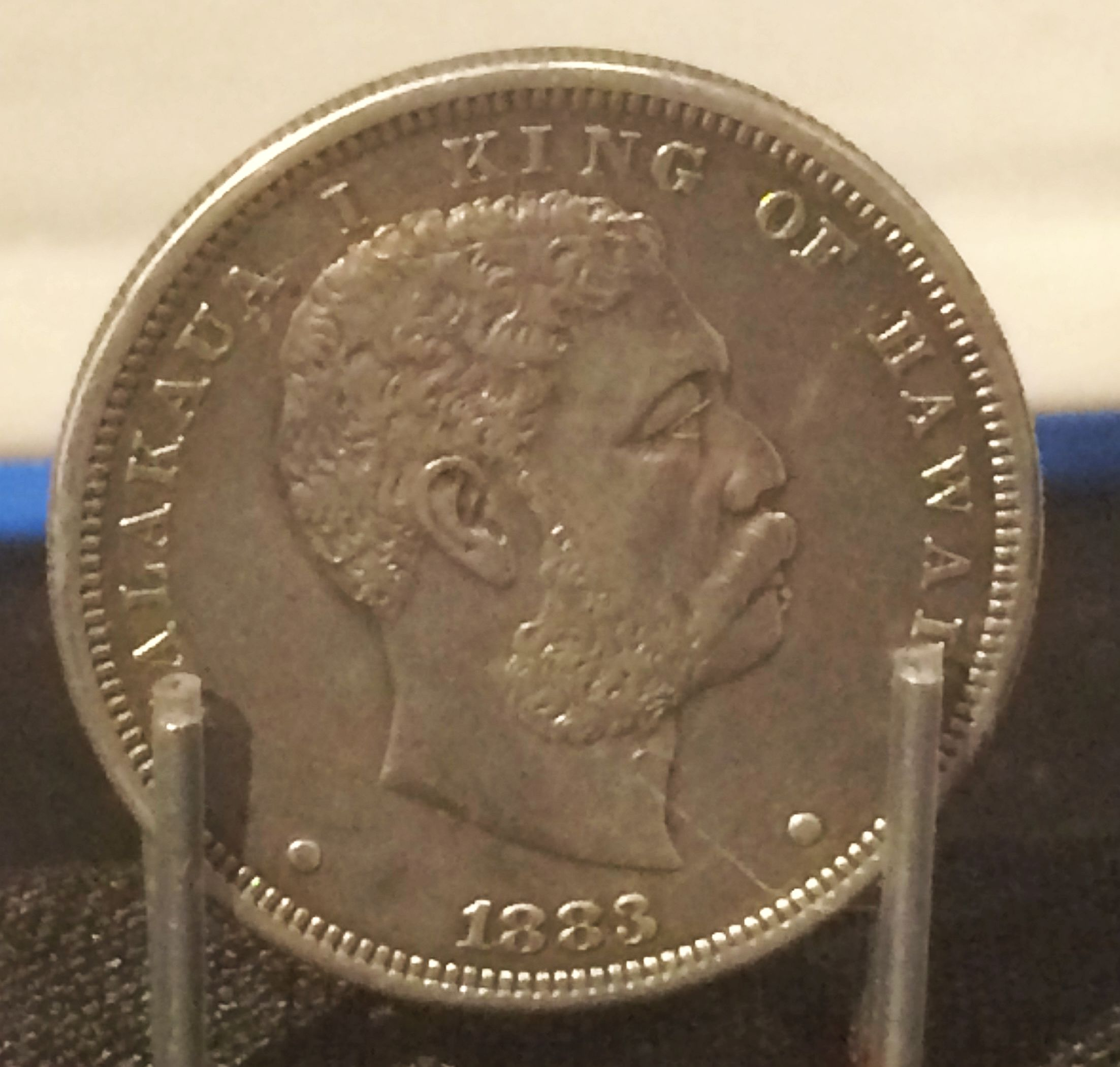
A silver 1883 one-dollar coin issued by the Kingdom of Hawaii under Kalākaua, with his face, obverse.

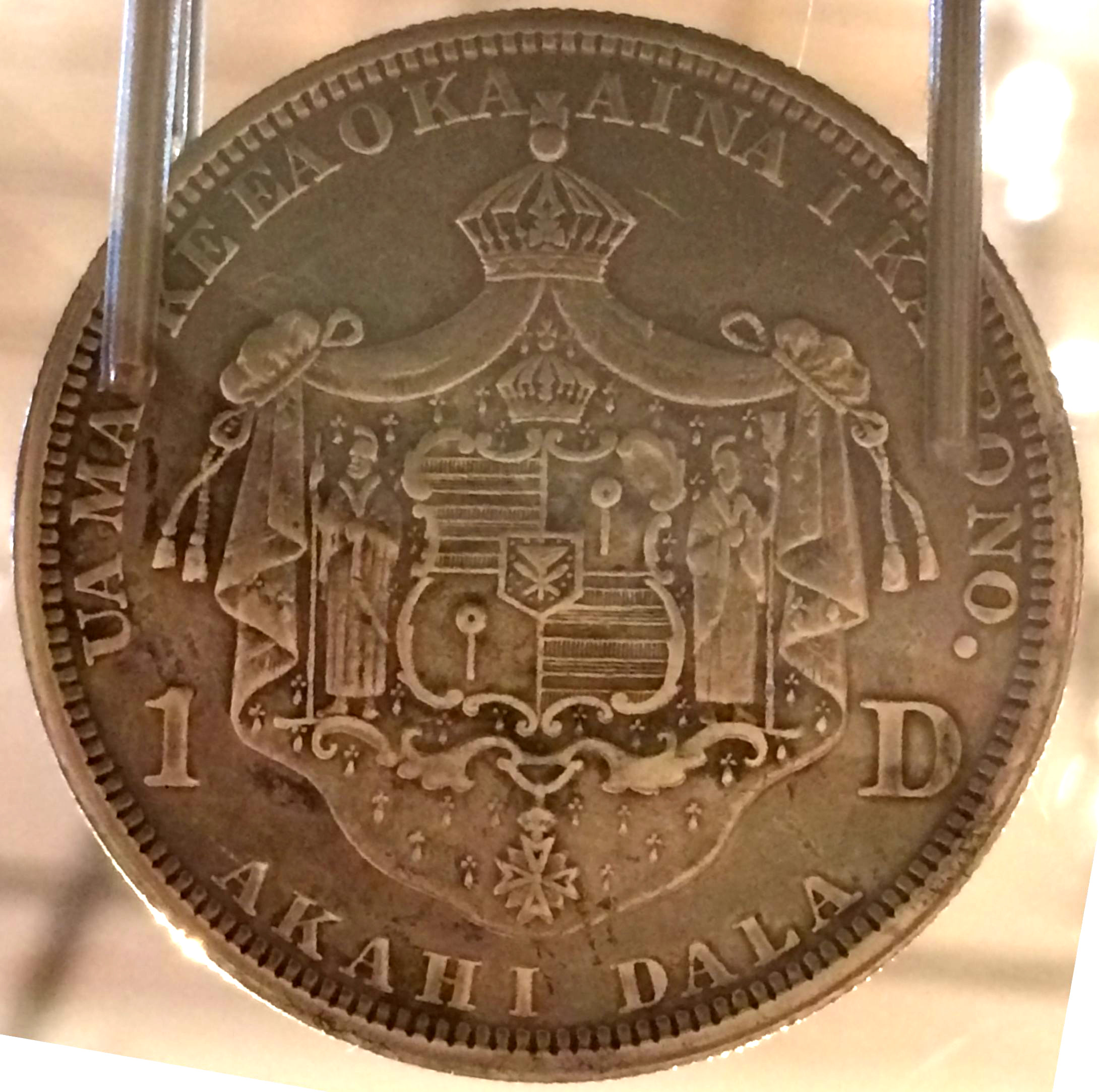
A silver 1883 one-dollar coin issued by the Kingdom of Hawaii under Kalākaua, with his face, reverse.

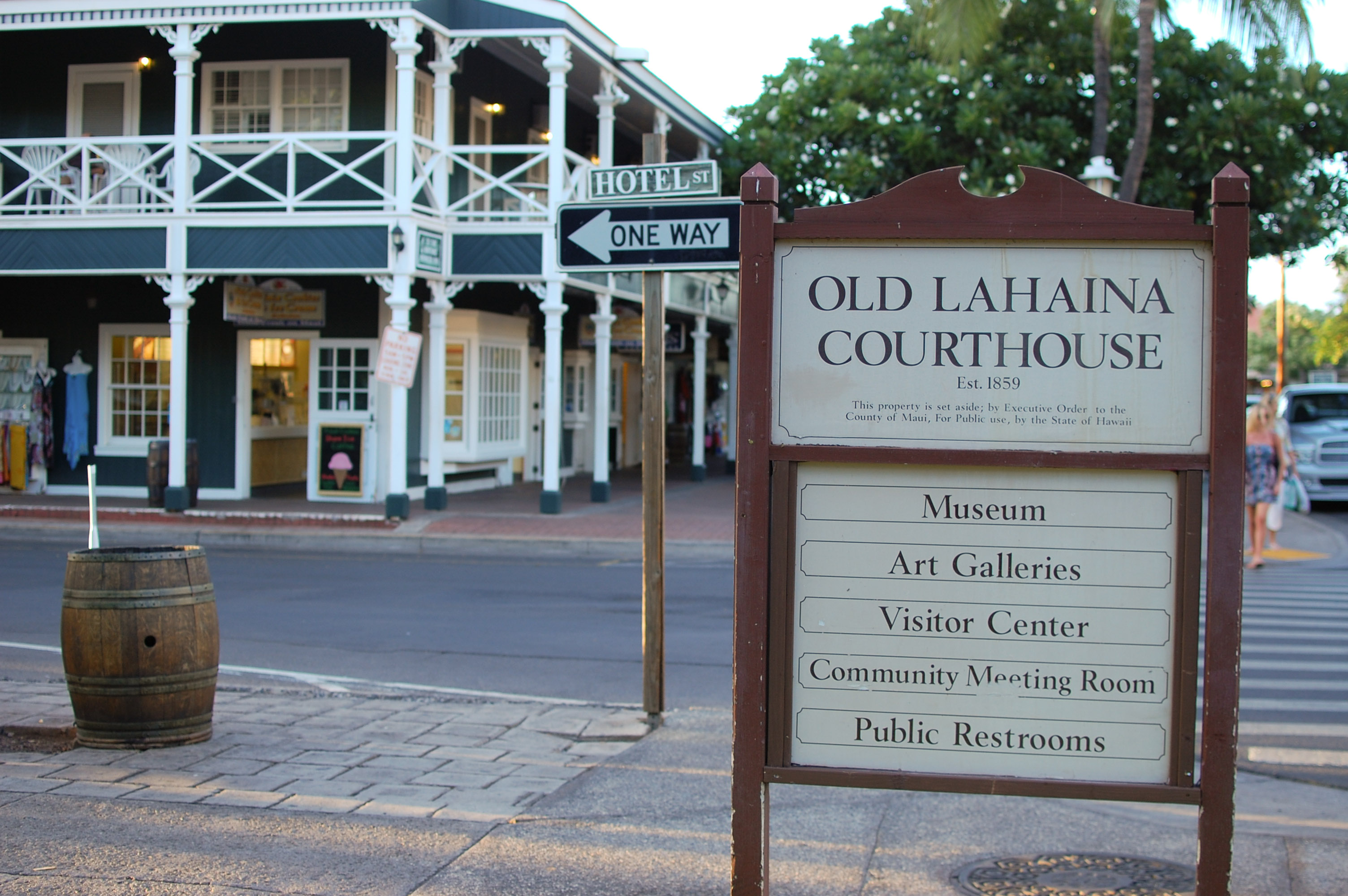
A sign seen at the Pioneer Inn, Lahaina, Maui, Hawaii with the museum listed below.

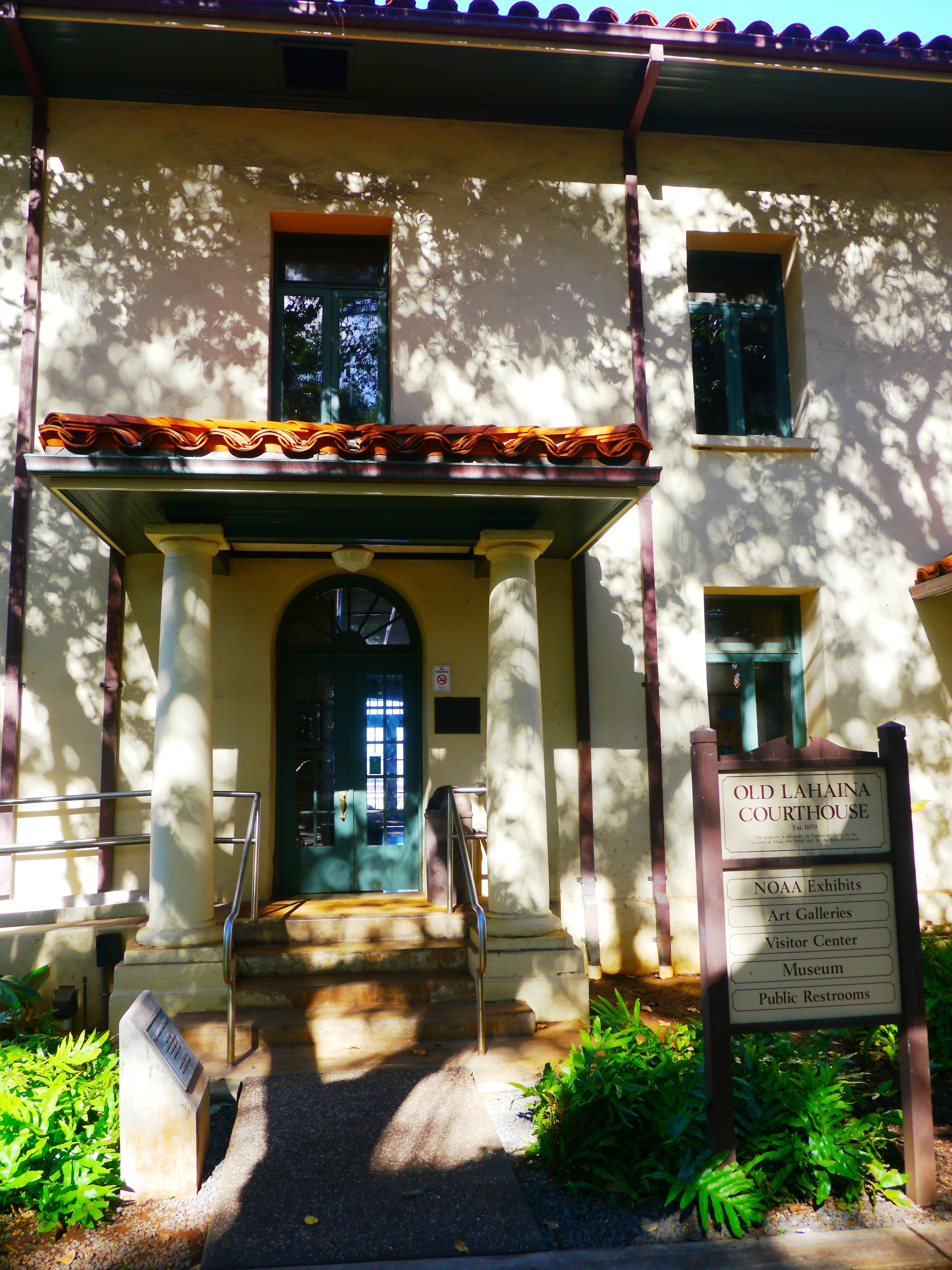
The entrance to the courthouse, also with an informative sign.

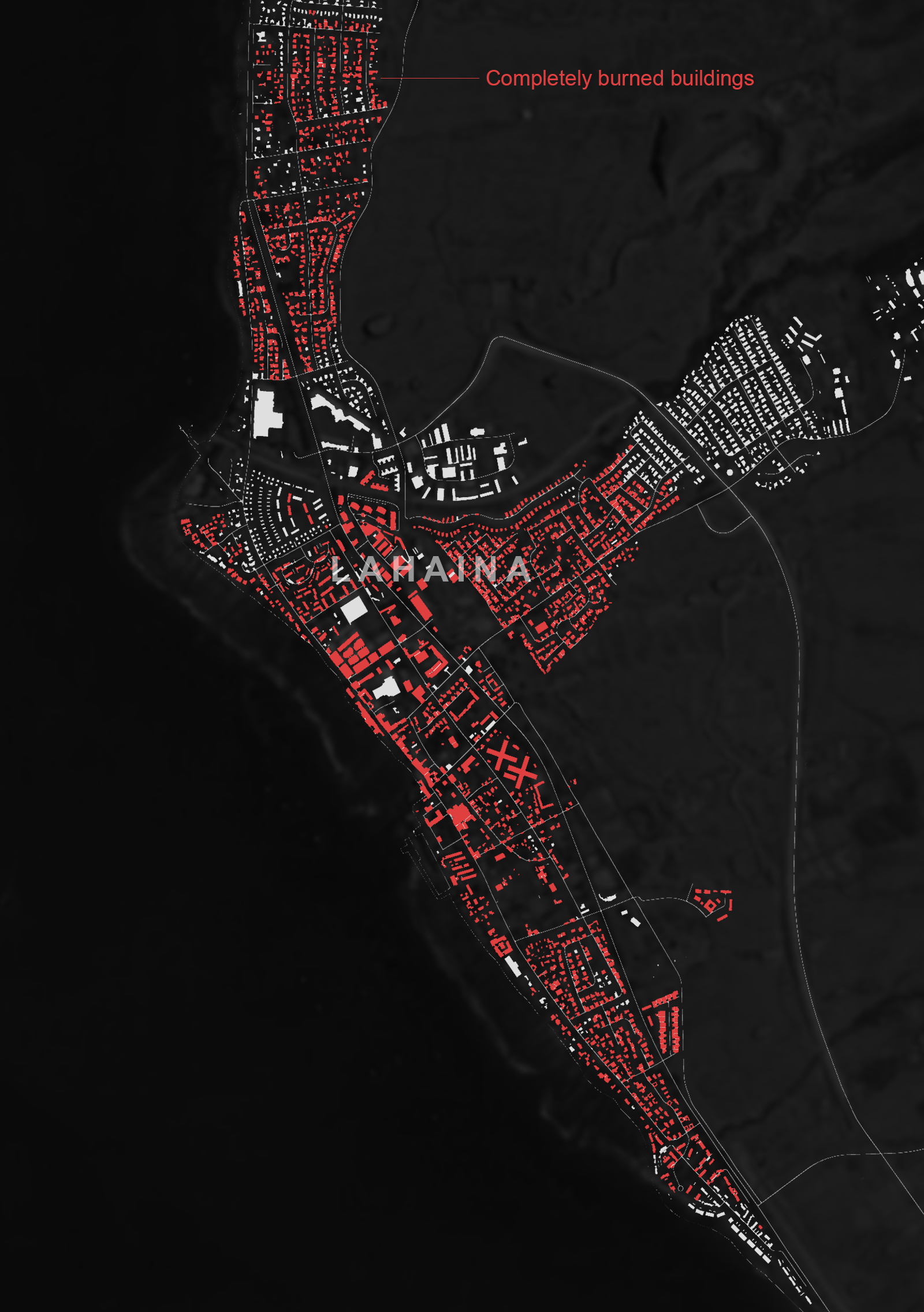
The aftermath of the Lahaina fire, with damaged or destroyed buildings highlighted in red, including the museum and old courthouse.

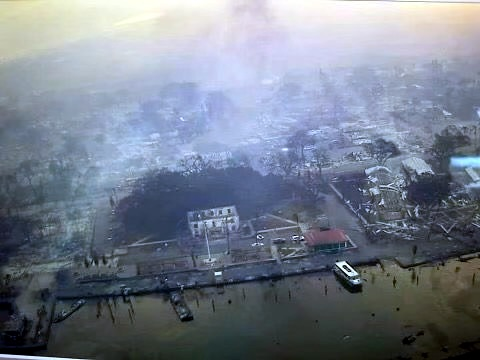
The Lahaina Heritage Museum and Old Lahaina Courthouse shown after the Lahaina fire, with catastrophic damage retained, courtesy of the Civil Air Patrol.
