= Nā ʻAikāne Cultural Center =

The Nā ʻAikāne o Maui Cultural and Research Center was a historic civic building and local cultural center in Lahaina, Hawaii. The center held artefacts of Native Hawaiian history and was a gathering place for the indigenous community. The Front Street building had a rich history of serving the West Side community hosting many non-profit organizations. The center once housed a soup kitchen for striking plantation workers during an International Longshore and Warehouse Union (ILWU) strike against the Pioneer Mill. The center was taken over by the Na ʻAikane o Maui in 2011. The building burned to the ground in the 2023 Hawaii wildfires.
