= Lāhainā Lighthouse =

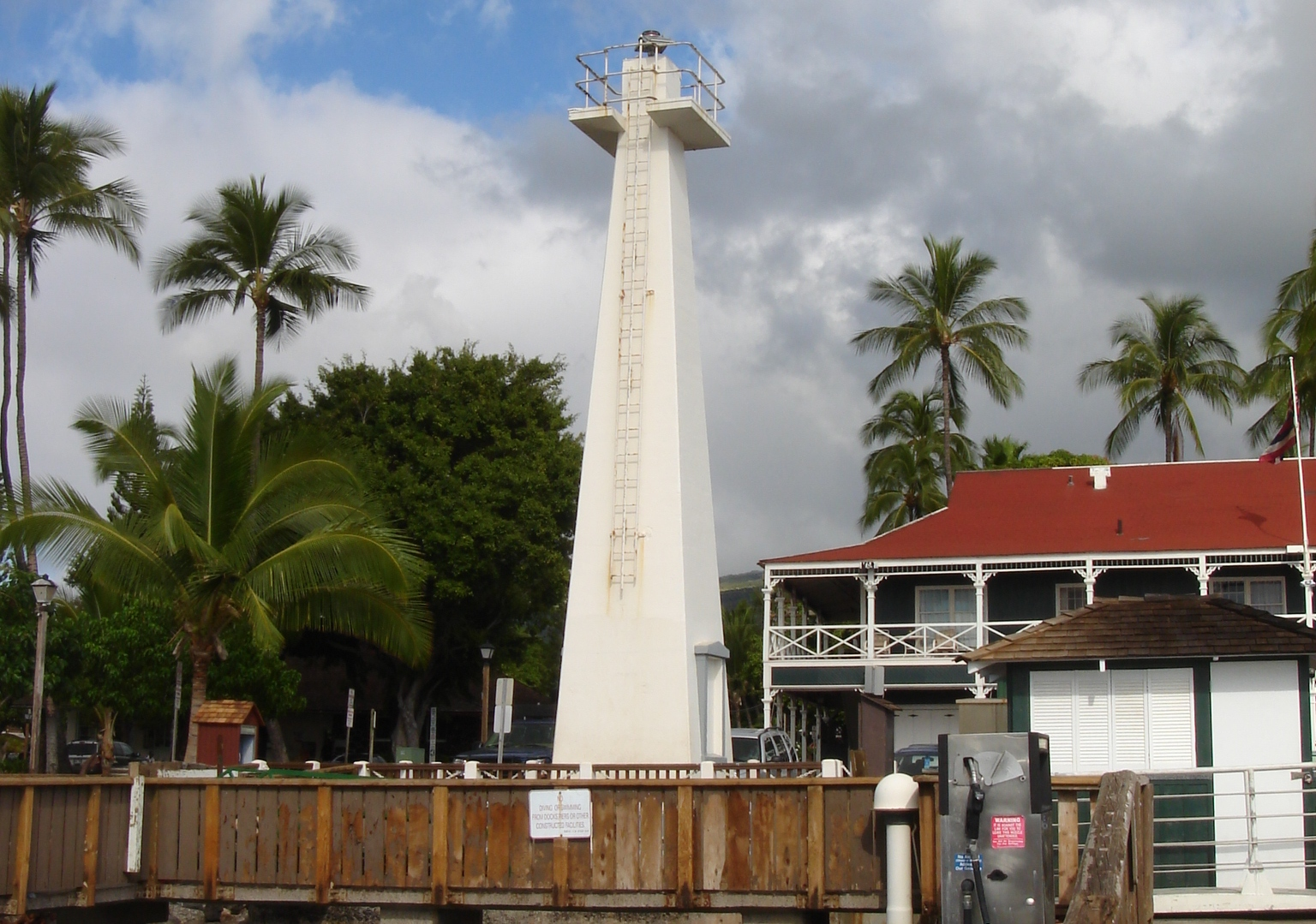
- The lighthouse in 2009
- Location: Lāhainā, Hawaiʻi
- Coordinates: 20°52′19″N 156°40′44″W

Tower
- Constructed: 1840 (original); 1905 (current)
- Construction: wood encased in concrete
- Height: 55 feet (17 m)
- Shape: pyramid

Light
- First lit: November 4, 1840
- Lens: Fresnel lens
- Light source: electricity (solar power)
- Range: 7 nautical miles (13 km; 8.1 mi)

The Lāhainā Lighthouse is a historic lighthouse and landmark in Lāhainā, Hawaiʻi. This lighthouse is managed by the United States Coast Guard and the Lāhainā Restoration Foundation maintains it. At the time of its unveiling in 1840, it was the first lighthouse built in Hawaiʻi.

== History ==
Lāhainā Harbor was a port of choice for whaling vessels from around the world between 1820 and 1860. King Kamehameha III established a first lighthouse there in 1840, which was Hawaiʻi's first. A second and then a third lighthouse were established in 1866. Due to its deficiency, a replacement lighthouse was built in 1905. It is a 55 feet (17 m) timber-framed pyramidal tower, with an enclosed room on top surmounted of the lantern equipped with a Fresnel lens.

== Gallery ==
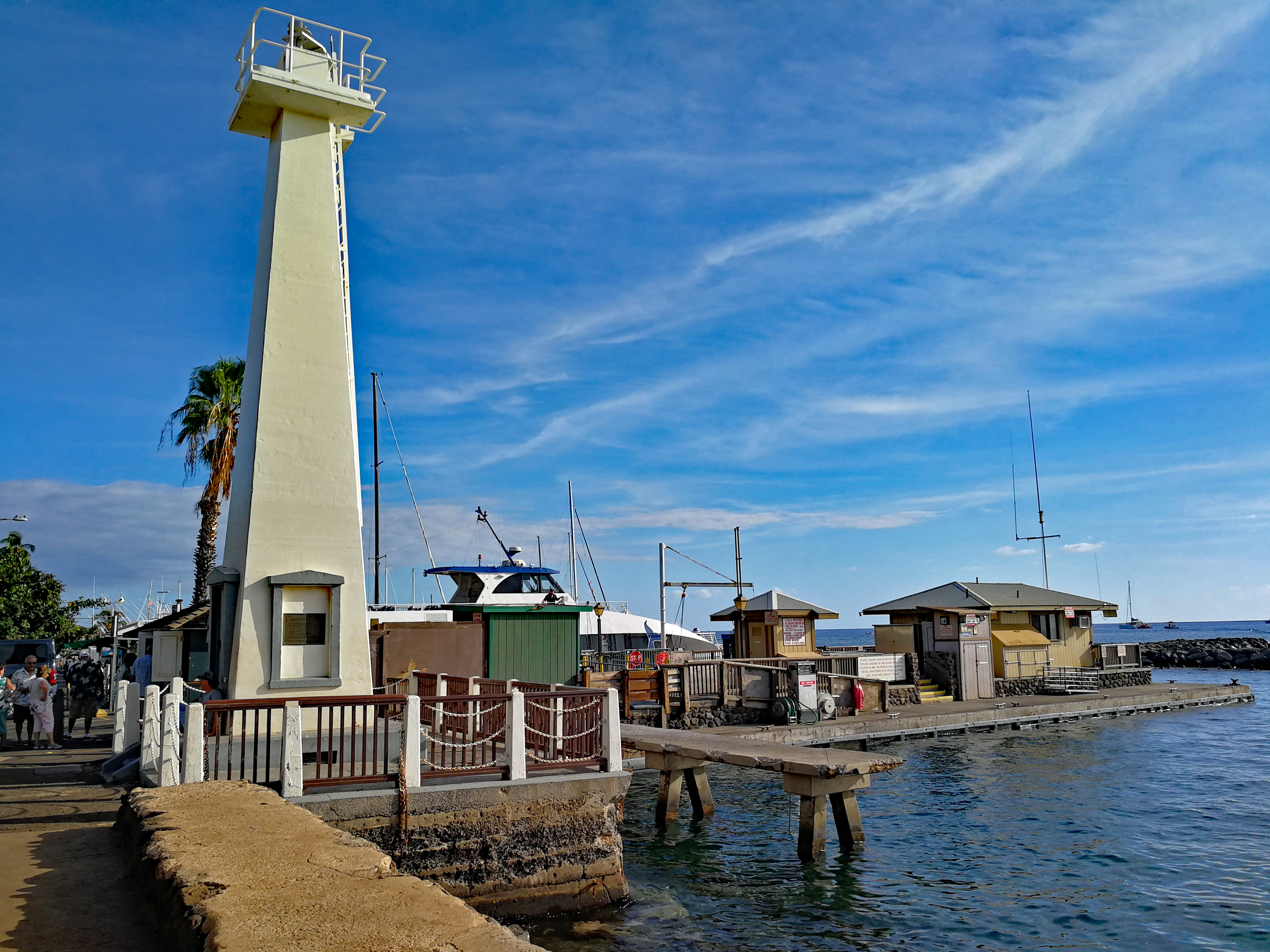
View from the north, 2018

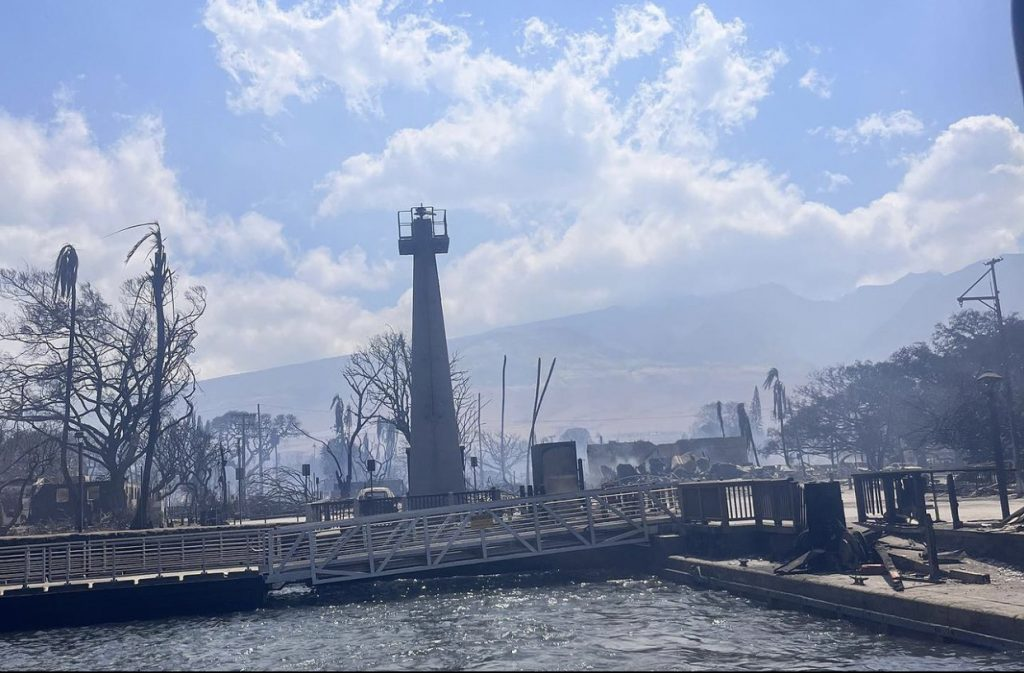
Lāhainā Lighthouse after the August 2023 wildfire
