= 2023 Hawaii wildfires =

Natural disasters in the USA

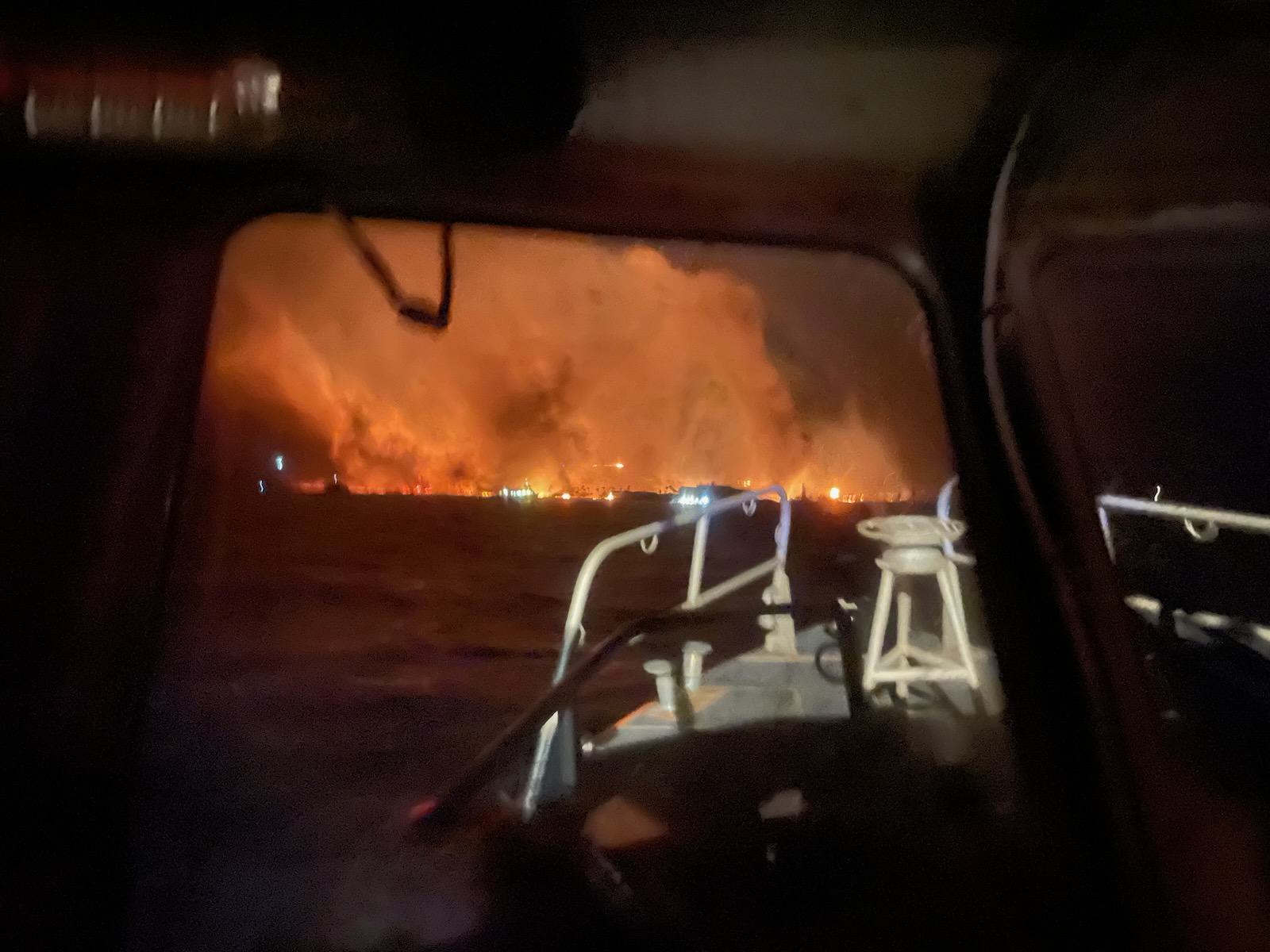
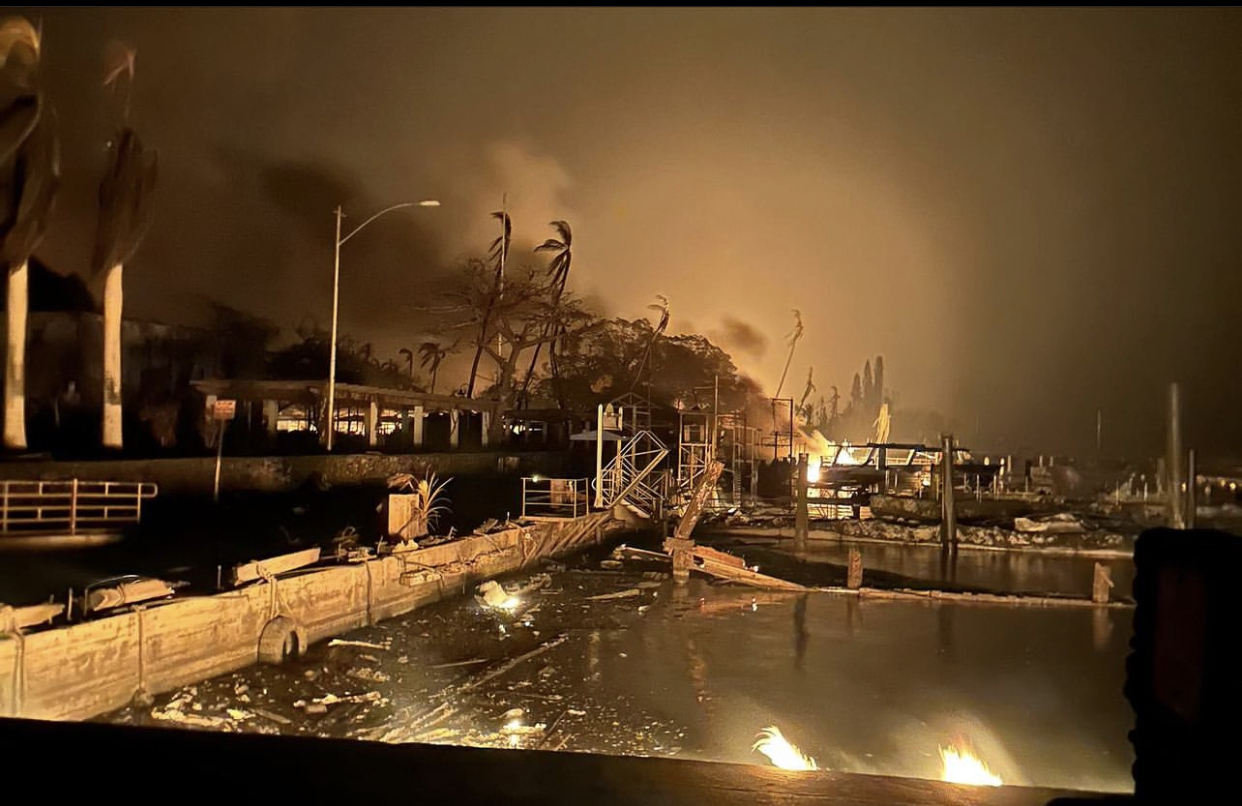
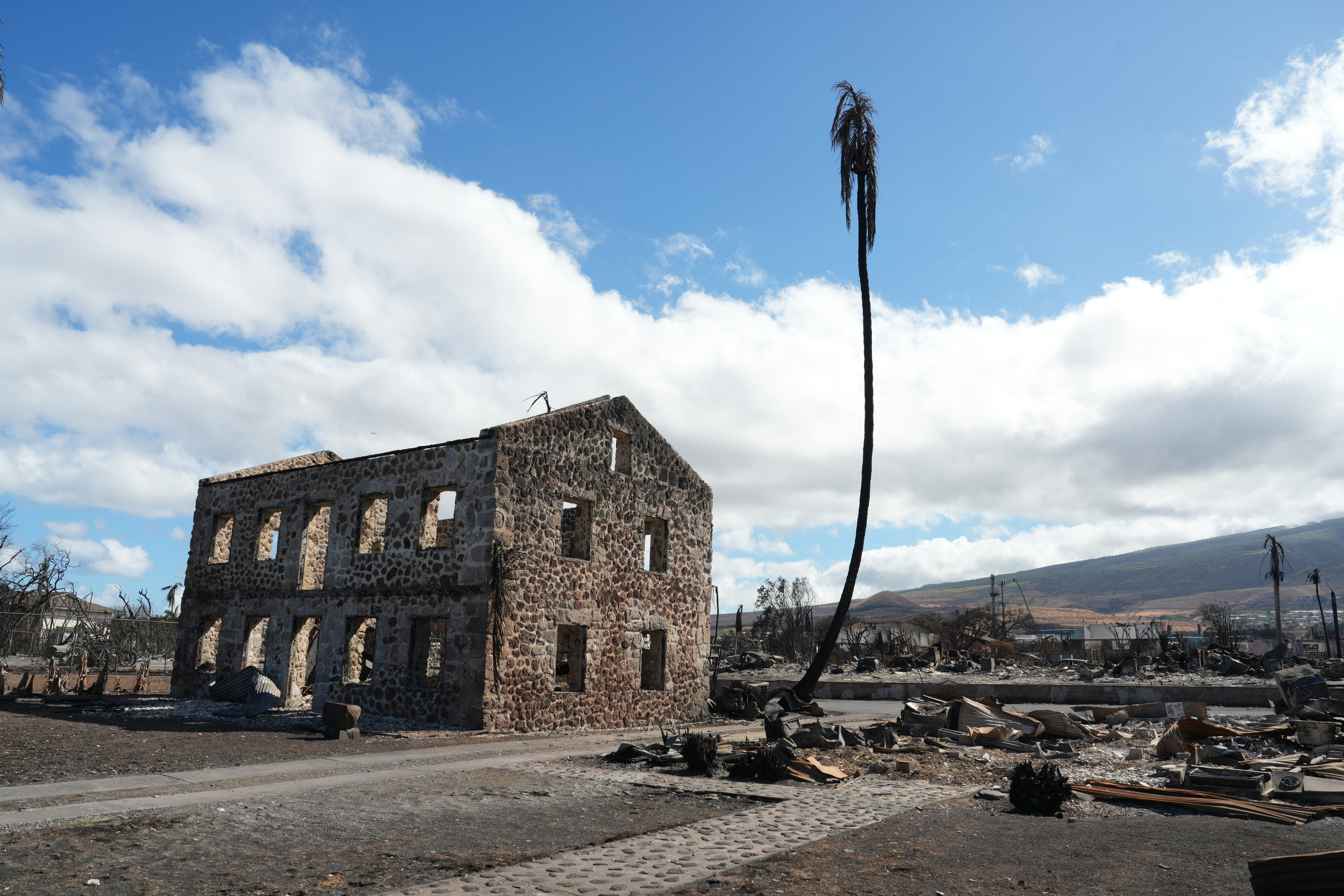
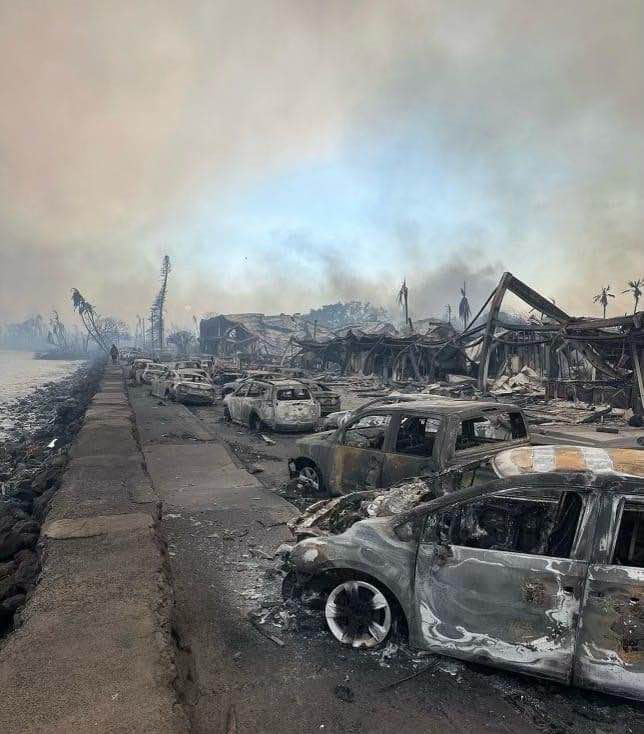
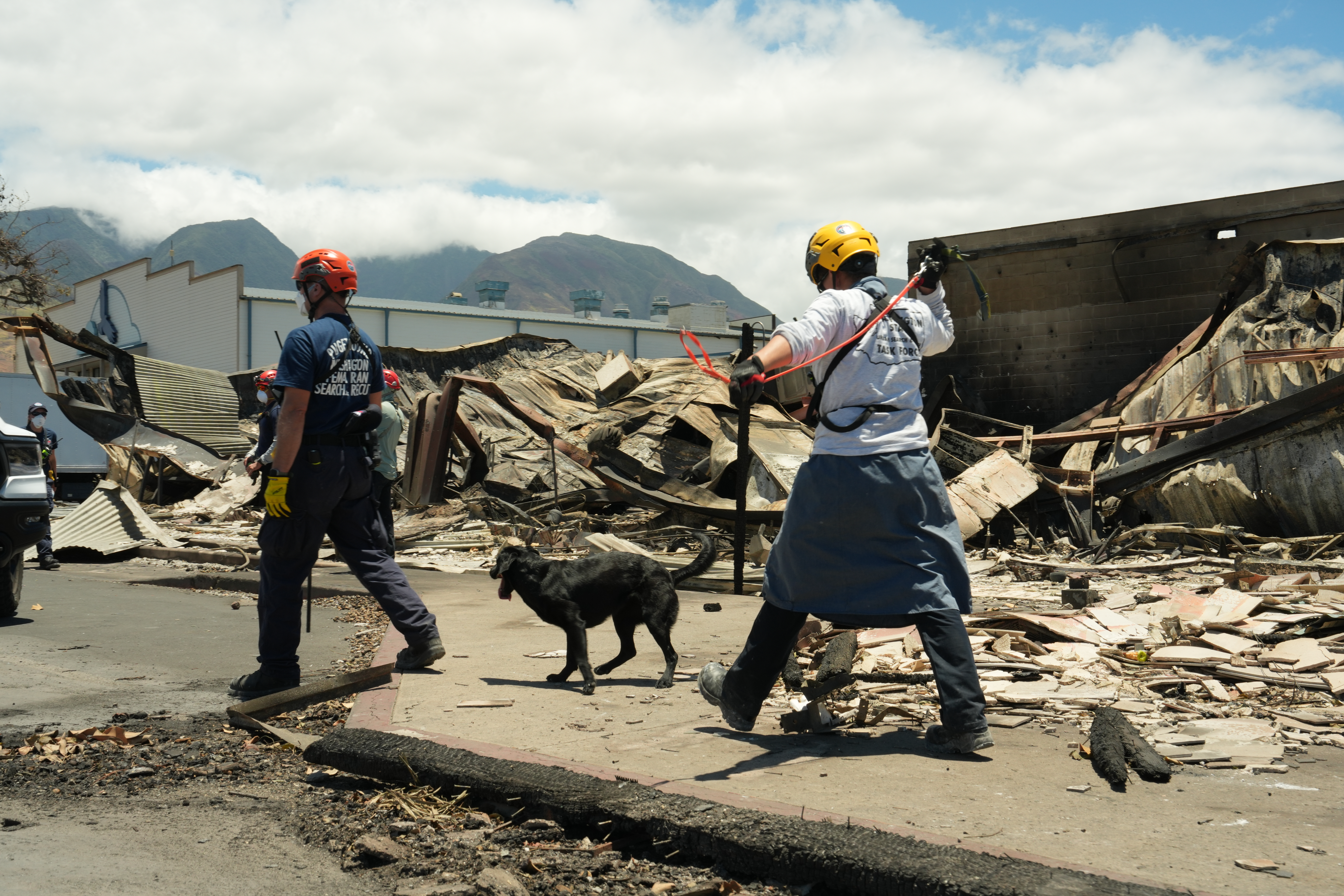
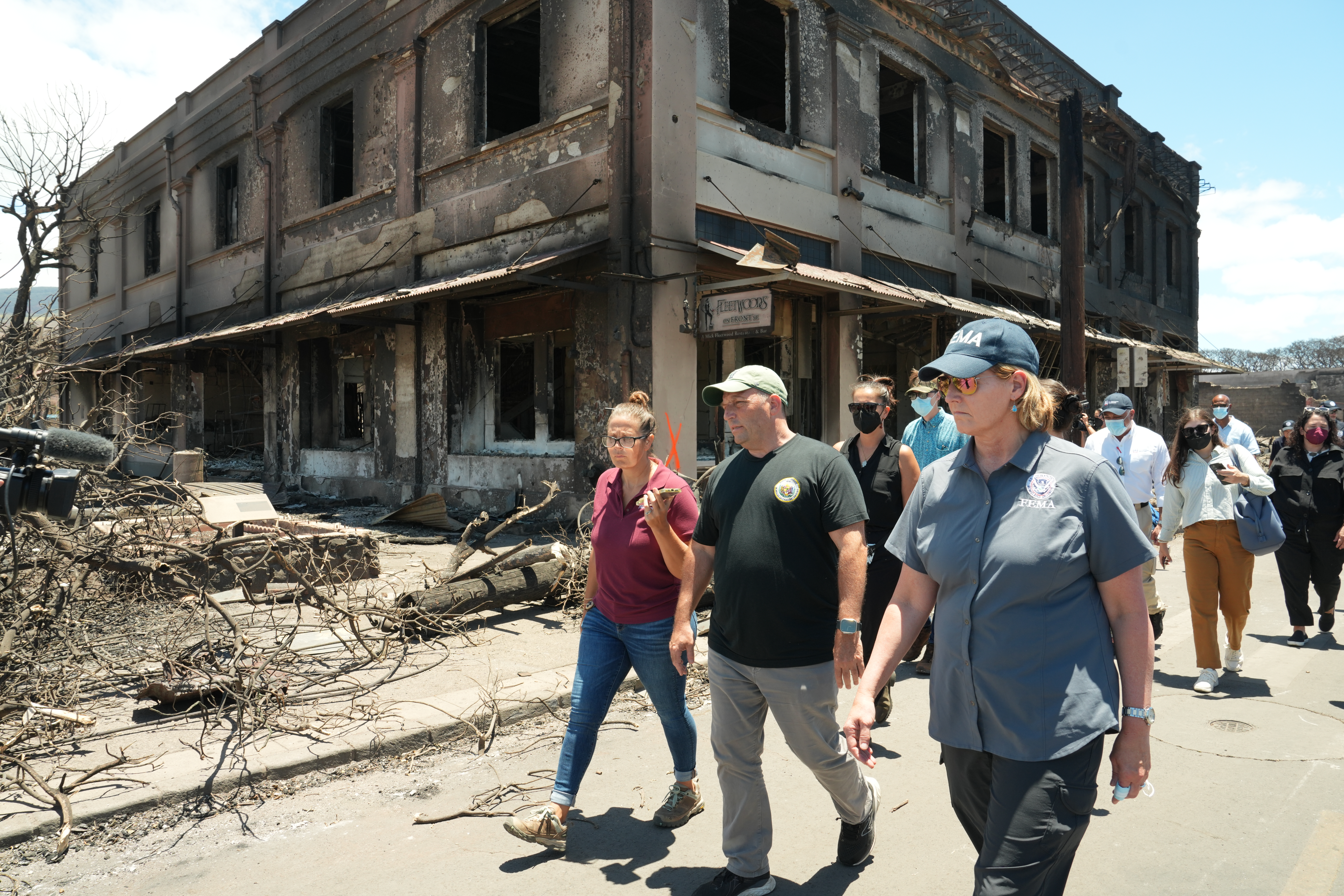
- Top: Lāhainā burning as seen from the ocean and harbor Middle: Burned cars and buildings Bottom: FEMA officials perform searches and Governor Josh Green reviews damage
- Date: August 8–16, 2023
- Location: Hawaii, United States

Statistics
- Total fires: 4
- Total area: 17,000+ acres (6,880+ ha)

Impacts
- Deaths: 102+
- Injuries: 67+
- Missing people: 2
- Structures destroyed: 2,207
- Cost: $5.5 billion

Ignition
- Cause: Propagation by dry conditions and high winds; Maui: Accidental; downed power line, re-ignition of fire thought to be extinguished; Hawaiʻi Island: unknown origins; unattended cook fire; incendiary device

Map
- Centroids of fires detected by spaceborne infrared imaging on August 8–10. Some parts are perimeters. (map data)

The 2023 Hawaii wildfires were a series of wildfires that broke out in early August 2023 in the U.S. state of Hawaii, predominantly on the island of Maui. The wind-driven fires prompted evacuations and caused widespread damage, killing at least 102 people and leaving two people missing in the town of Lahaina on Maui's northwest coast. The proliferation of the wildfires was attributed to dry, gusty conditions created by a strong high-pressure area north of Hawaii and Hurricane Dora to the south.

An emergency declaration was signed on August 8, authorizing several actions, including activation of the Hawaii National Guard, appropriate actions by the director of the Hawaii Emergency Management Agency and the Administrator of Emergency Management, and the expenditure of state general revenue funds for relief of conditions created by the fires. By August 9, the state government of Hawaii issued a state of emergency for the entirety of the state. On August 10, U.S. President Joe Biden issued a federal major disaster declaration.

For the Lahaina fire alone, the Pacific Disaster Center (PDC) and the Federal Emergency Management Agency (FEMA) estimated that over 2,200 buildings had been destroyed, overwhelmingly residential and including many historic landmarks in Lahaina. The damage caused by the fire has been estimated at nearly $6 billion. In September 2023, the United States Department of Commerce published the official damage total of the wildfires as $5.5 billion (2023 USD).

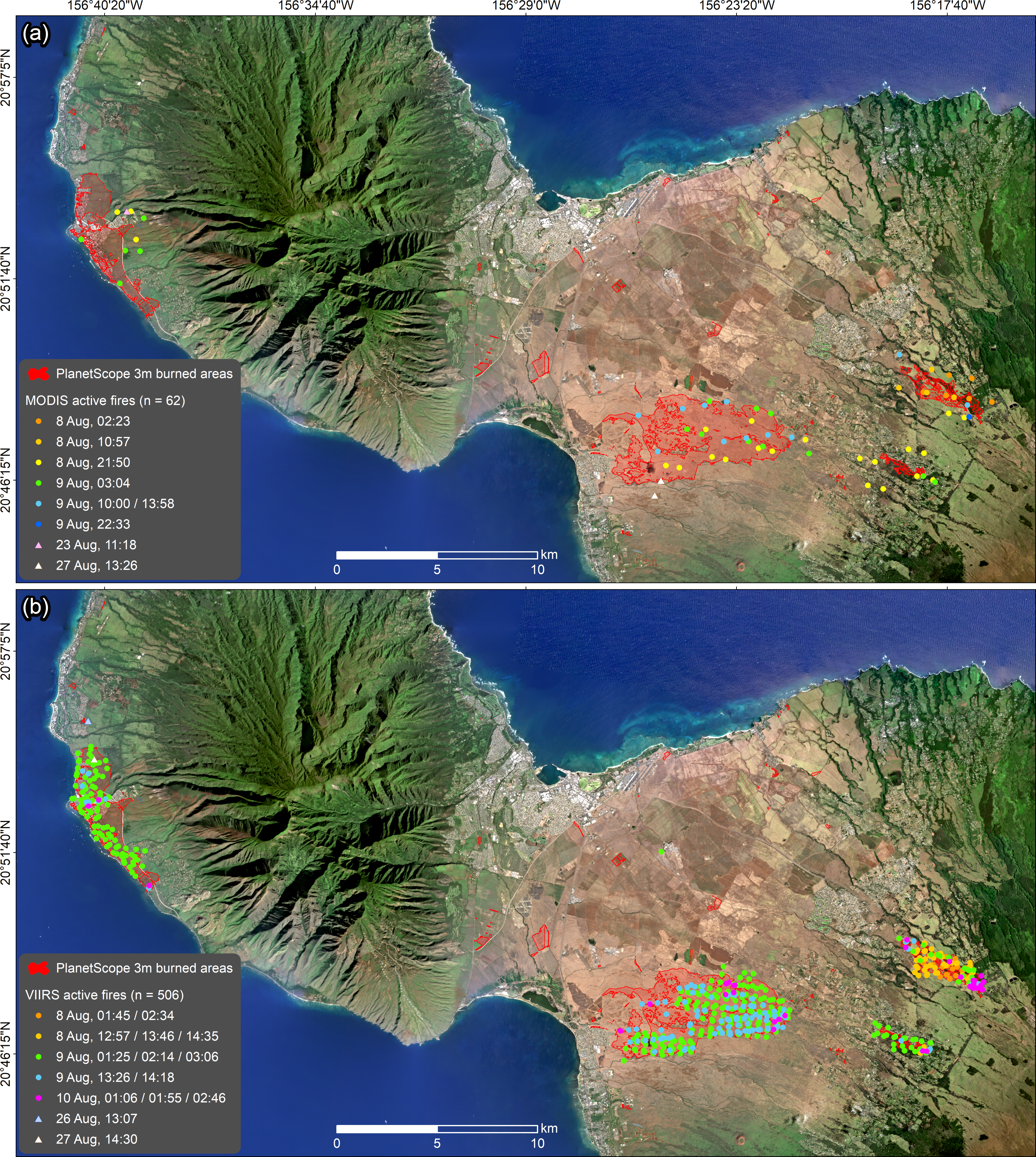
MODIS satellite 1 km and VIIRS satellite 375 m active fire detections (colored by the day of burning and whether they were detected in the daytime or nighttime) and 3 m PlanetScope burned areas (red polygons) over Maui.

== Background ==
=== Wildfire risk ===
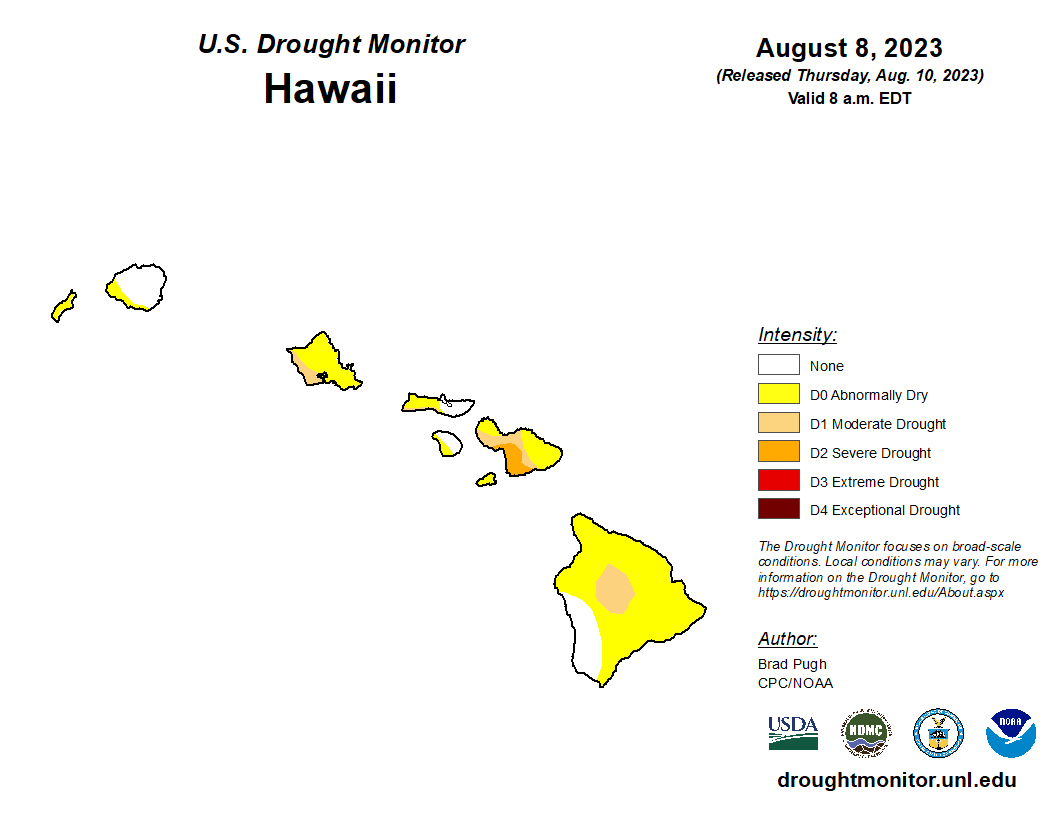
The U.S. Drought Monitor showing drought conditions in Hawaii as of August 8, 2023,

The typical area burned by wildfires in Hawaii has increased in recent decades, almost quadrupling. Experts have blamed the increase on the spread of nonnative vegetation and hotter, drier weather due to climate change.

During the 2010s and early 2020s, Clay Trauernicht, a botanist and fire scientist at the University of Hawaiʻi at Mānoa, and several other experts warned that the decline of agriculture in Hawaii meant that large areas of formerly productive land were left unmanaged; nonnative invasive species like guinea grass were spreading rapidly and increasing the risk of large wildfires. The state government failed to provide incentives or impose mandates to keep land clear of grass or require all structure owners to maintain defensible space, a standard rule in fire-prone states like California. The shrinking of the agricultural workforce reduced overall firefighting capacity; those workers had traditionally suppressed fires on the land they cared for, and were so effective that sometimes the counties called them for help. In 2022, Trauernicht suggested that Hawaii follow Europe's example by subsidizing agriculture as a public good as a form of fire risk reduction. In 2023, UH Manoa biogeography professor Camilo Mora estimated the cost of land restoration to mitigate wildfire risk at about $1 billion. Despite these calls to action, the Hawaii State Legislature was unable to make much progress; a 2022 bill to spend just $1.5 million on additional fire risk reduction measures died in a legislative committee.

Around the time the fires occurred, twenty percent of the county of Maui was experiencing moderate drought (level 1 of 4), and sixteen percent was under severe drought conditions (level 2 of 4). A decrease in rainfall consistent with the predicted impacts of climate change had also been recorded in the Hawaiian Islands, according to the U.S. National Climate Assessment. In the decades leading up to the fire, overdevelopment practices led to further water management challenges that reduced the availability of water for firefighting and exacerbated drought conditions.

In June 2014, the Hawaii Wildfire Management Organization, a nonprofit organization, prepared a Western Maui Community Wildfire Protection Plan which warned that most of the Lahaina area was at extremely high risk for burning.

In Maui County's 2020 Hazard Mitigation Plan, the county identified Lahaina, the most heavily impacted community in the August fires, as lying within a high risk zone for wildfire.

In its monthly seasonal outlook on August 1, 2023, the National Interagency Fire Center (NIFC) forecast "above normal" potential for significant wildland fires for Hawaii in August, concentrated on the islands' leeward sides. In addition to noting plentiful vegetation growth from the previous wet season and the expanding drought, the NIFC mentioned that "tropical cyclones can also bring windy and dry conditions depending on how they approach the island chain and can exacerbate fire growth potential".

Long term assessments gravely underestimated the vulnerability of the islands to deadly wildfires. A year prior, the State of Hawaii Comprehensive Emergency Management Plan Report detailed wildfire risks as one of the lowest threats for the state. A 2021 Maui County assessment acknowledged the spike of wildfires in the state, but described funds as "inadequate" and heavily criticized the county fire department's strategic plan, claiming it said "nothing about what can and should be done to prevent fires".

=== Weather factors ===
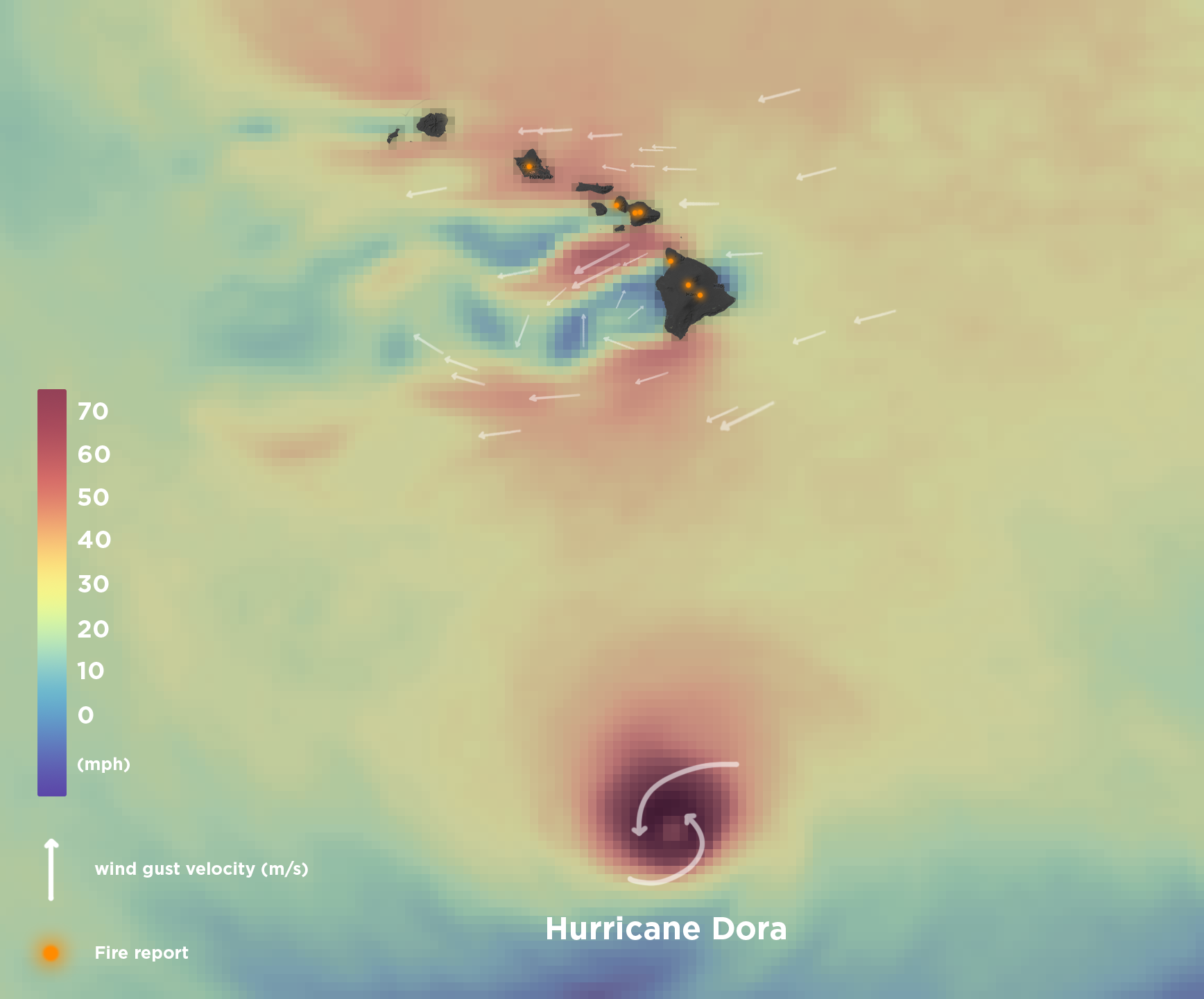
Wind speeds/gusts from Hurricane Dora near the Hawaiian Islands on August 8

In early August 2023, a high-pressure system remained north of the Hawaiian Islands. This formed strong surface pressure north of the islands, and also sustained stabilization across the region, creating warm and sunny conditions. Concurrently, Hurricane Dora began to intensify to Category 4 strength, which helped create a large pressure difference between the high-pressure area and the low-pressure cyclone. This pressure difference aided in already significant trade winds moving southwest, and formed strong gradient winds over the islands. (A similar phenomenon occurred during the October 2017 Portugal wildfires during the passage of Hurricane Ophelia.) The exact significance of Hurricane Dora and how it impacted the fires remains somewhat unclear. Meteorologists noted that the storm's center remained more than 700 miles (1,100 km) from the islands and relatively small in size; however it also remained "remarkably potent for a long time", logging more hours as a Category 4 hurricane than any other storm in the Pacific for over 50 years. Philippe Papin, a hurricane specialist with the National Hurricane Center, argued that Hurricane Dora played only a minor role in "enhancing low-level flow over Maui at fire initiation time."

By August 6, the National Weather Service identified a region of very dry air arriving from the East Pacific, greatly inhibiting the potential for rainfall. A prominent descending capping inversion forced even more stabilization of the atmosphere, which led to enhanced wind gusts and very dry conditions between August 7 and 8. As the day progressed, deep layer ridging combined with the existing pressure gradient created very strong wind gusts and caused humidity levels to be well below normal. The aforementioned cap was expected to only strengthen acceleration of wind due to terrain features near the islands.

== List of wildfires ==
Perimeters of wildfires on Maui (map data)

| Name | County | Acres | Start date | End date | Refs |
|---|---|---|---|---|---|
| Olinda | Maui | 1,081 | August 8 | September 28 (Note: 100% contained date. Unclear extinguished date.) | |
| Kula | Maui | 202 | August 8 | September 28 | |
| Lahaina | Maui | 2,170 | August 8 | September 3 | |
| Pulehu | Maui | 3,268 | August 8 | August 12 | |

== Timeline ==
Satellite infrared imagery loop of the fires on August 8

During the first few days of August, a multitude of minor brush fires affected the Hawaiian Islands. Multiple brush fires burned on the island of Oʻahu, stretching fire department resources, but were quickly contained by August 4. The island's south and west sides remained abnormally dry or in drought because of the fire, as well as weather conditions.

At 5:00 a.m. HST (UTC 15:00) on August 7, the National Weather Service's office in Honolulu issued a red flag warning for the leeward portions of all the islands until the morning of August 9, highlighting that "very dry fuels combined with strong and gusty easterly winds and low humidities will produce critical fire weather conditions through Tuesday night". East winds of 30–45 miles per hour (48–72 km/h) with gusts over 60 miles per hour (97 km/h) were forecast. In Maui County, officials reported gusts up to 80 miles per hour (130 km/h) in the Upcountry Maui area.

=== Maui ===
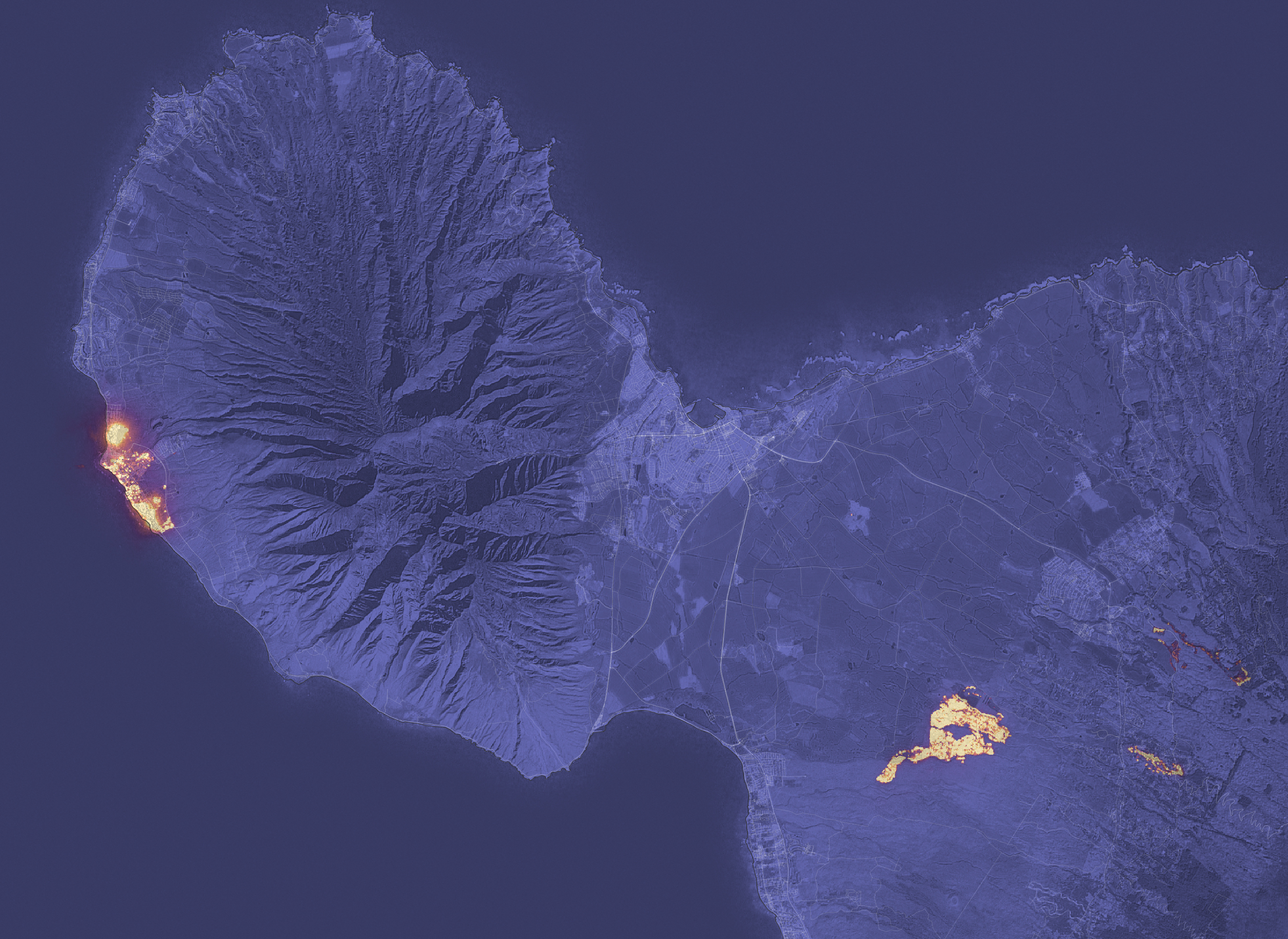
Maui as seen from infrared satellite the night of August 8

On August 4, 2023, at 11:01 a.m. HST (UTC 21:01), the first of many small fires ignited on Maui. A 30-acre brush fire was reported adjacent to the Kahului Airport in a field. By 9:29 p.m. HST (UTC 07:29), the fire was reported 90% contained, but many flights out of the airport were delayed to August 11.

On August 8, 2023, intense winds knocked down numerous utility poles. By 4:55 p.m. HST (UTC 02:55), "about 30 downed poles" had been reported on Maui, resulting in "at least 15 separate outages impacting more than 12,400 customers". By that time, there had been no power in some parts of West Maui since 4:50 a.m. HST (UTC 14:50).

==== Kula ====
The first significant fire of the event was reported at 12:22 a.m. HST (UTC 10:30) on August 8 near Olinda Road in the community of Kula, in Upcountry Maui. Evacuations of nearby residents were announced beginning at 3:43 a.m. (UTC 13:43). As of August 9, the fire had burned approximately 1,000 acres (400 ha). Approximately 544 structures were exposed, 96% of which were residential, and 16 burned. Concurrent electrical grid sensor data and security camera footage reported by The Washington Post indicate that a downed power line, hit by a tree, may have caused this fire.

==== Lahaina ====
Perimeter of Lāhainā Fire (map data)

The most significant fire of the complex of events began from a brush fire ignited in West Maui near the town of Lahaina on the morning of August 8. During the early morning of August 8, significant straight-line winds began to impact the town of Lahaina. Peak wind gusts that exceeded 80 miles per hour (130 km/h) caused minor damage to homes and buildings in Lahaina, and subsequently, a power pole was snapped along Lahainaluna Road, across the street from the Lahaina Intermediate School near the northeast side of town.

A three-acre (1.2 ha) brush fire was reported at 6:37 a.m. HST (UTC 16:37) as the downed power line sparked flames to dry grass near the road. Evacuations were ordered minutes later in the areas around Lahaina Intermediate School. Maui County Fire Department immediately responded, and by 9:00 a.m HST (UTC 19:00), the fire was announced fully contained.

As wind gusts continued to batter the town, the fire was thought to have been extinguished. By 3:30 p.m. HST (UTC 01:30), the fire had flared up again, and forced the closure of Lahaina Bypass (Route 3000), with more evacuations nearby following. Residents on the west side of town received instructions to shelter in place.

The wildfire rapidly grew in both size and intensity. Wind gusts pushed the flames through the northeastern region of the community, which held dense neighborhoods. Hundreds of homes burned in minutes, and residents identifying the danger attempted to flee in vehicles while surrounded by flames. As time progressed, the fire moved southwest and downslope towards the Pacific coast and Kahoma neighborhood. Firefighters were repeatedly stymied in their attempts to defend structures by failing water pressure in fire hydrants; as the melting pipes in burning homes leaked, the network lost pressure despite the presence of working backup generators.

At 4:46 p.m. HST (UTC 02:46), the fire reportedly crossed Honoapiʻilani Highway (Hawaii Route 30) and entered the main part of Lahaina, forcing residents to self-evacuate with little or no notice. At this time, bumper-to-bumper traffic developed. By 5:45 p.m. HST (UTC 03:45), the fire had reached the shoreline, when the United States Coast Guard first learned of people jumping into the ocean at Lahaina to escape the fire. Survivors later recalled getting trapped in a traffic jam and realizing they needed to go into the water when cars around them either caught fire or exploded.

Officials said that civil defense sirens were not activated during the fire even though Hawaii has the world's largest integrated outdoor siren warning system, with over 80 sirens on Maui alone meant to be used in cases of natural disasters. Several residents later told journalists that they had received no warning and did not know what was happening until they encountered smoke or flames. There had been no power or communications in Lahaina for much of the day, and authorities issued a confusing series of social media alerts which reached a small audience.

The death toll stood at 67 on August 11, but that number reflected only victims found outside buildings, because local authorities had waited for FEMA to send its specialized personnel to search building interiors. According to federal officials, many of the victims found outside "were believed to have died in their vehicles". The fire burned 2,170 acres (880 ha) of land. PDC and FEMA estimated that 2,207 buildings had been destroyed, with a total of 2,719 exposed to the fires, and set the damage estimate at $5.52 billion as of August 11. The next day, Governor Josh Green announced the damage was close to $6 billion. Many historic structures were destroyed, including Waiola Church and Pioneer Inn. 86% of burned structures in Lāhaina were residential.

As of August 12, at least 93 people had been confirmed dead in and around Lahaina with only 3% of the area searched. The number of dead was expected to rise further as FEMA search-and-rescue specialists searched the interiors of burned-down buildings. Very few victims had been identified.

By August 24, with 100% of single-story, residential properties searched of the disaster area, 115 casualties were confirmed with an additional 388 people missing. On September 7 officials reported that 99% of the area was searched, with the death toll unchanged at 115 and the missing count reduced to 110. The disaster area remained restricted to authorized personnel due to unstable structures, exposed electrical wires, and potentially toxic ash and debris. The following day, the missing count was further reduced to 66 people. On September 15, the death toll was reduced from 115 to 97 as officials reported that DNA findings discovered that some remains came from the same victims. The number of missing persons was also reduced to 31 with only 1 addition to the list.

On September 25 a small number of residents were allowed to enter North Lahaina for the first time in over six weeks. Officials planned to remove restrictions for all areas of the city over the next one to two months, pending cleanup efforts by the EPA.

The Lahaina fire's death toll was the largest for a wildfire in the U.S. since the Cloquet fire of 1918, which killed 453 people.

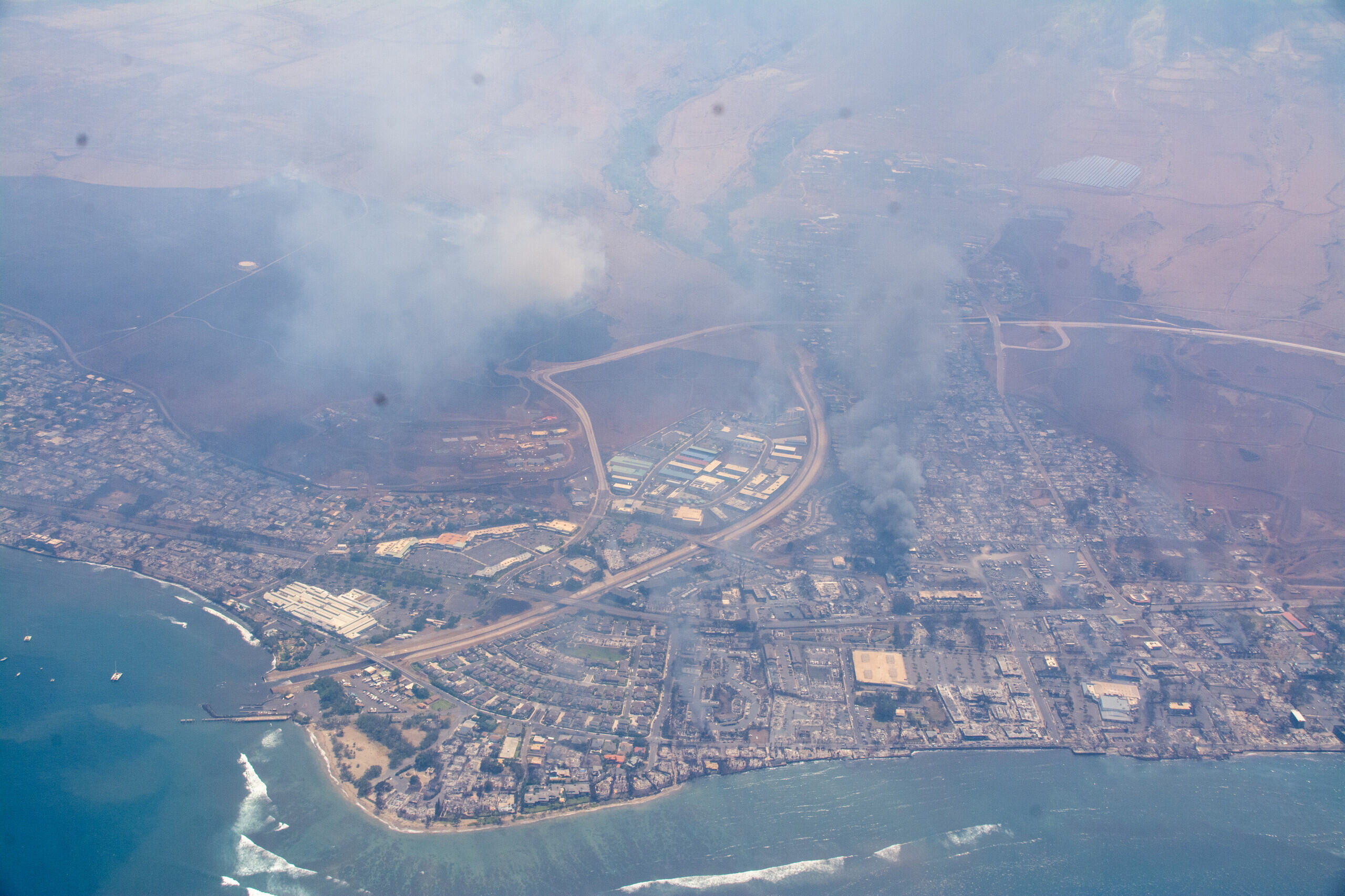
Lahaina from above

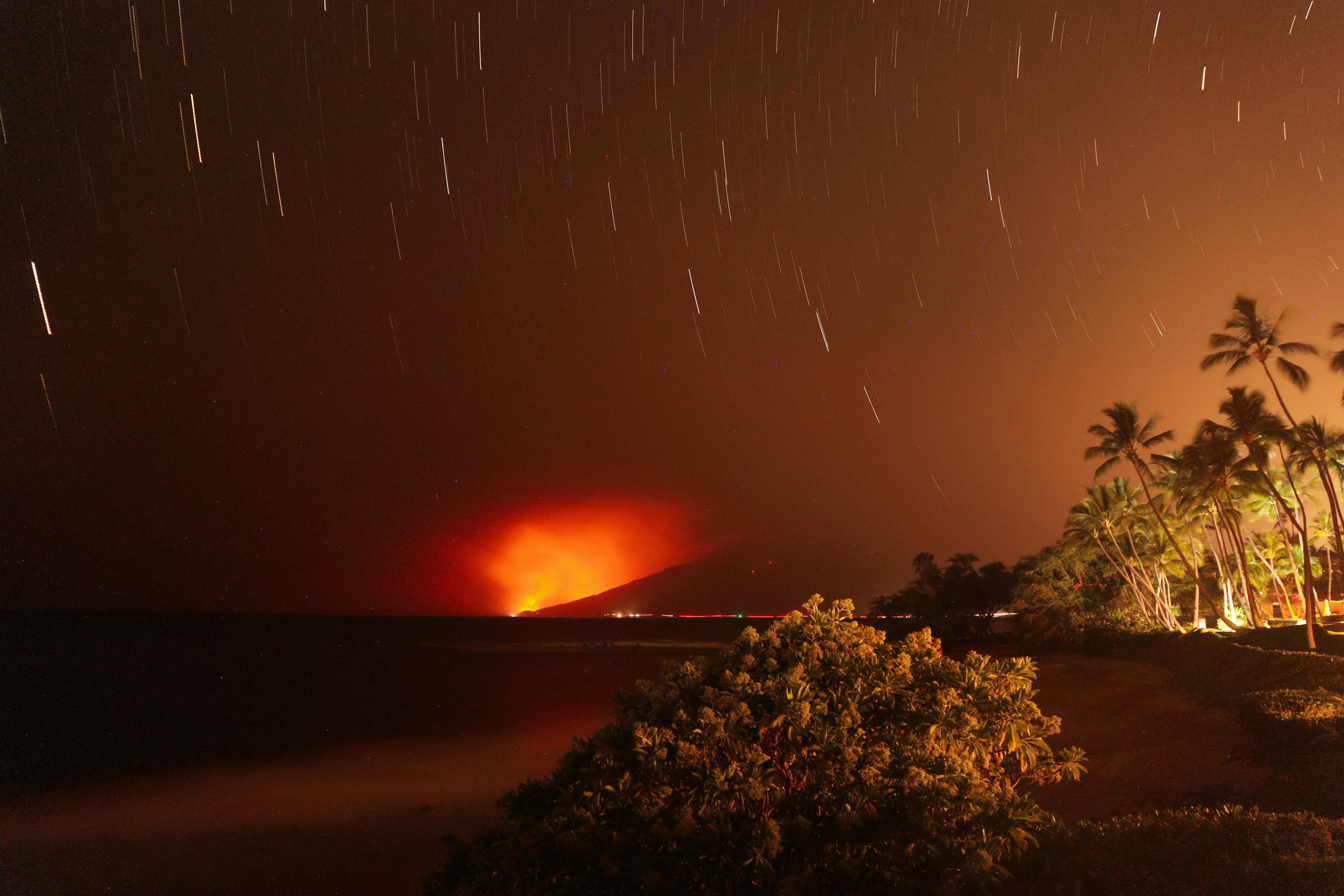
A long-exposure photograph of Lahaina on the night of August 8 to 9 from South Maui—the curved streaks are star trails, not embers

==== Pūlehu-Kīhei ====
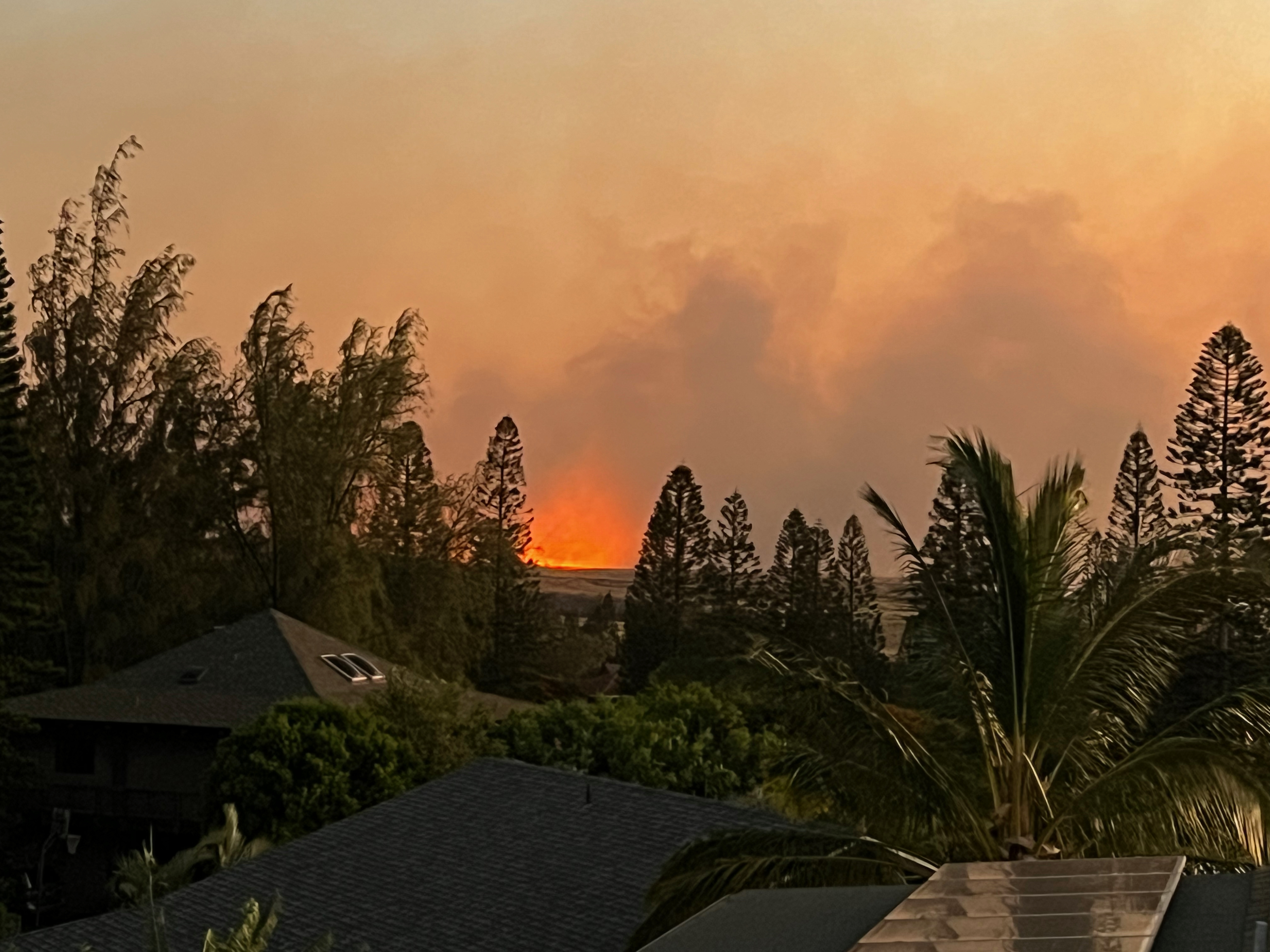
August 8 fire above Kīhei, HI

On the same night as the Kula and Lahaina fires, another major fire sparked near Pūlehu Road, north of Kīhei. The fire quickly spread in the direction of the prevailing winds, and by early August 9, the large fire entered northeast portions of Kīhei, resulting in an evacuation order for multiple communities nearby. Within the following days, firefighters fully contained the fire and all residents were advised that it was safe to return.

==== Other fires ====
A small, single acre fire ignited on August 11, which led to the evacuation of Kāʻanapali in West Maui before it was contained that same day. Another fire in Kāʻanapali would ignite again on August 26 and have an evacuation order placed and lifted on the same day.

=== Hawaiʻi Island ===
In Hawaiʻi County, neighborhoods in the North and South Kohala districts of the Island of Hawaiʻi were evacuated due to rapidly spreading brush fires. On August 9, several other brush fires broke out near the communities of Nā'ālehu and Pāhala; those fires were quickly brought under control. Hawaiʻi County Mayor Mitch Roth said there were no reports of injuries or destroyed homes on the Big Island.

=== Oʻahu ===
On August 16, a large brushfire sprung up on the outskirts of Wahiawā on Oʻahu. Though it did not burn near any houses, the fire threatened local homeless people as well as the Kūkaniloko Birth Site, a location registered under the National Register of Historic Places and near-thousand year old site that is the location of the births of Hawaiian chiefs.

== Impact ==
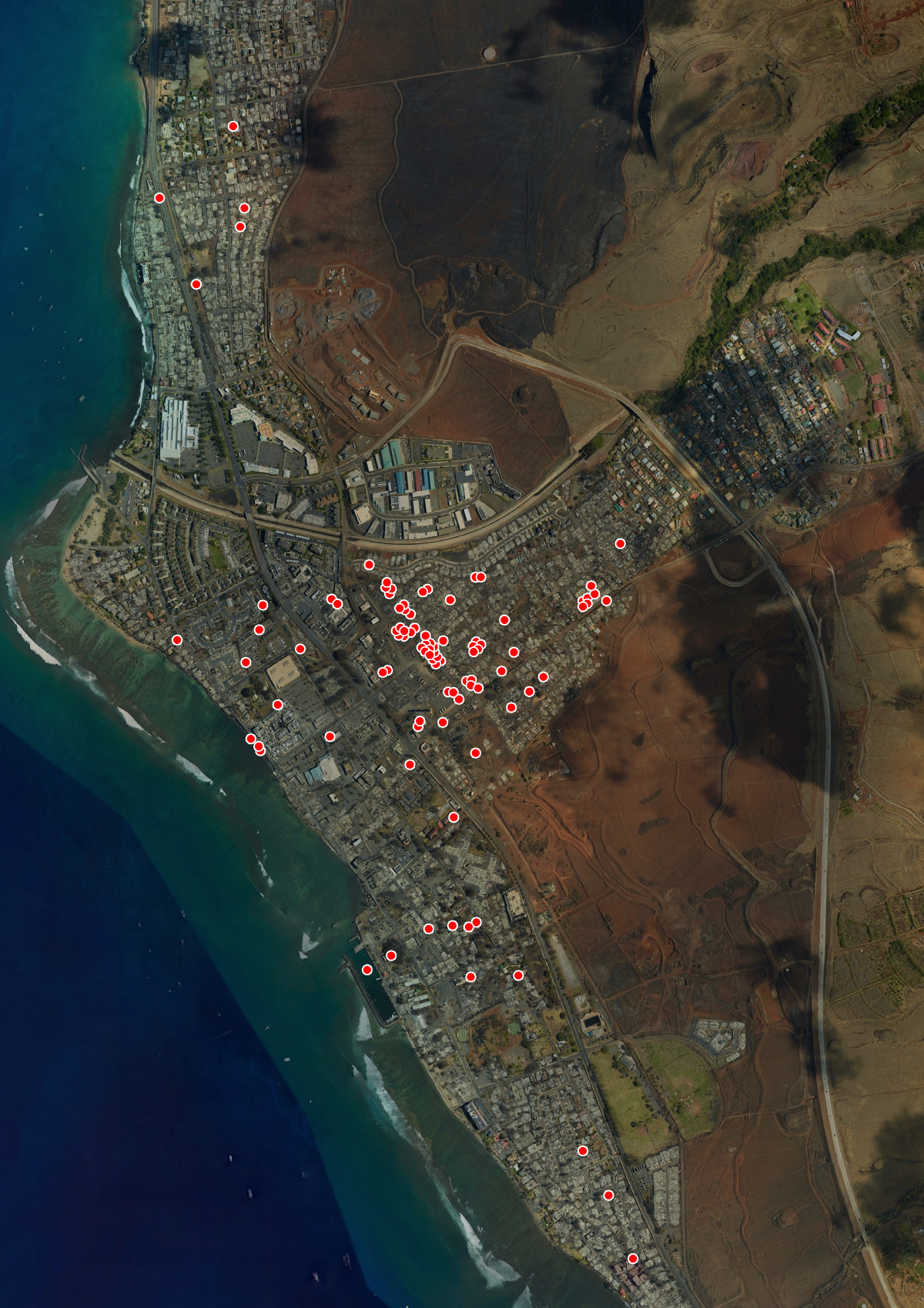
Deaths in Lahaina Zoomed area near densest quantity of fatalities

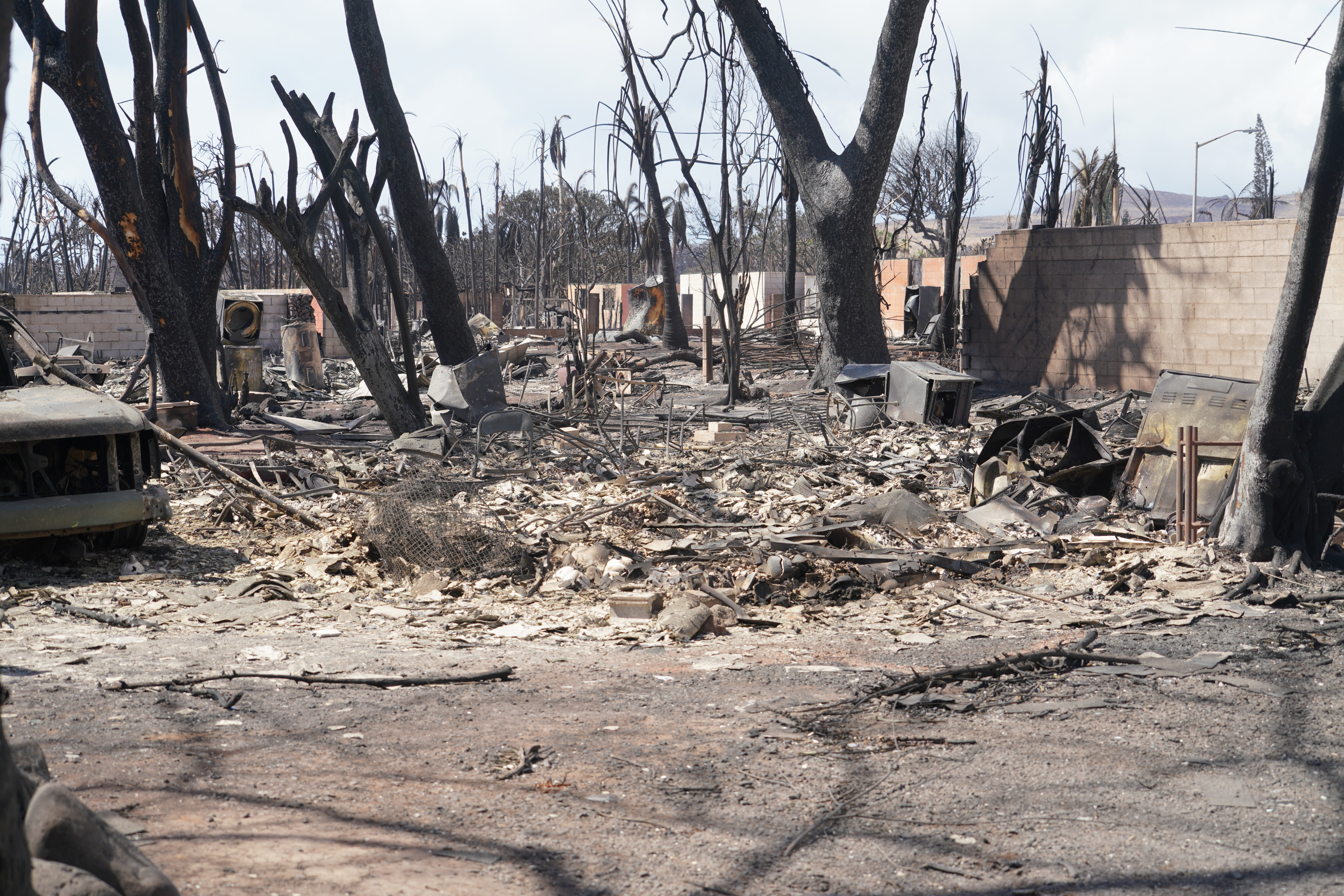
Burned building remains in Lahaina

The governor of the state of Hawaii, Josh Green, referred to the Lahaina wildfires as the "worst natural disaster" in the history of Hawaii. (Note: Prior to statehood, the tsunami from the 1946 Aleutian Islands earthquake killed 165–173 people in the Hawaiian Islands, which is widely considered the worst natural disaster in Hawaii.) It is the fifth-deadliest wildfire in United States history, and the most lethal wildfire in the country since the Cloquet fire of 1918, which killed 453 people.

=== Casualties ===
Fatalities and Percent searched
| Date | Fatality | Missing | % searched |
|---|---|---|---|
| 13 Aug | 96 | | |
| 14 Aug | 99 | | 25% |
| 15 Aug | 106 | | |
| 16 Aug | 111 | | |
| 19 Aug | 114 | | 85% |
| 21 Aug | 115 | | |
| 22 Aug | 115 | 1,000-1,100 | |
| 24 Aug | 115 | 388 | |
| 29 Aug | 115 | | 100% |
| 18 Sep | 97 | | |
| 29 Sep | 98 | 12 | |
| 14 Nov | 100 | 4 | |
| 13 Feb 2024 | 101 | 2 | |
| 24 Jun 2024 | 102 | 2 | |

As of June 24, 2024, there were 102 confirmed deaths due to the Lahaina fire on Maui, all of whom have been identified. An additional two individuals remain unaccounted for as of February 14, 2024. Among the dead was a Filipino national who was a naturalized U.S. citizen. The death toll in West Maui made it the deadliest wildfire and natural disaster recorded in Hawaii since statehood.

As of August 18, at least 67 people were injured in the fires. On August 9, at least twenty individuals were reported hospitalized at a Maui hospital. Six additional individuals, three of whom had critical burns, were reportedly transported by air ambulance from Maui to hospitals on Oʻahu.

On August 17, 60 survivors were found alive sheltering inside a single home.

At times after the fire, the reported number of casualties was thought to be as high as 115. Using DNA testing, it was eventually established that the total number of casualties was 102.

=== Damage ===
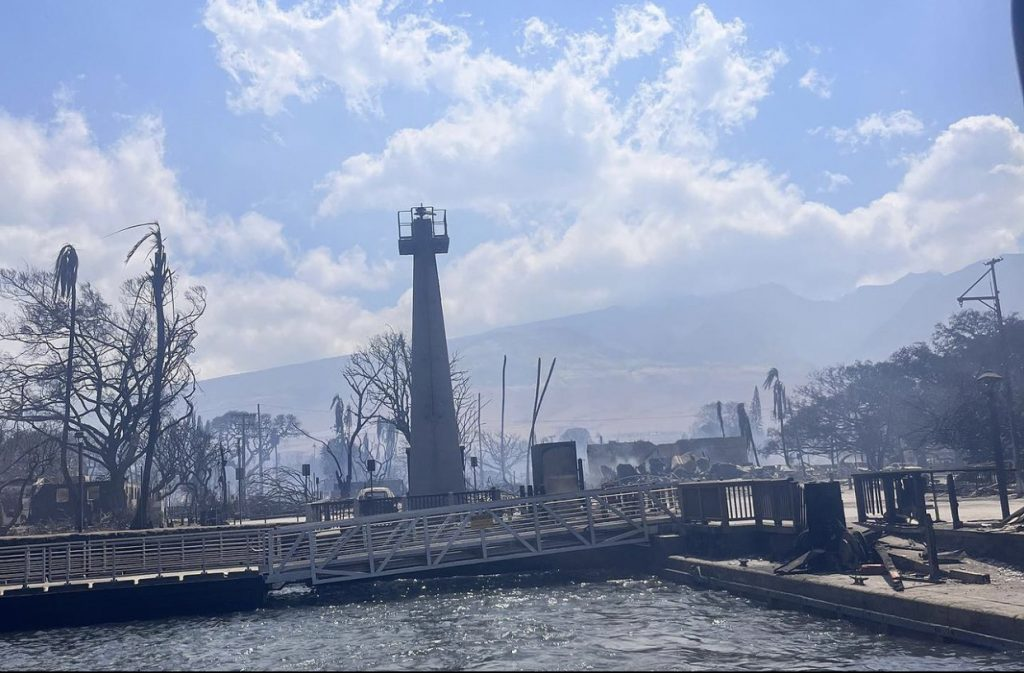
Lahaina Lighthouse surrounded by August 2023 wildfire ruins

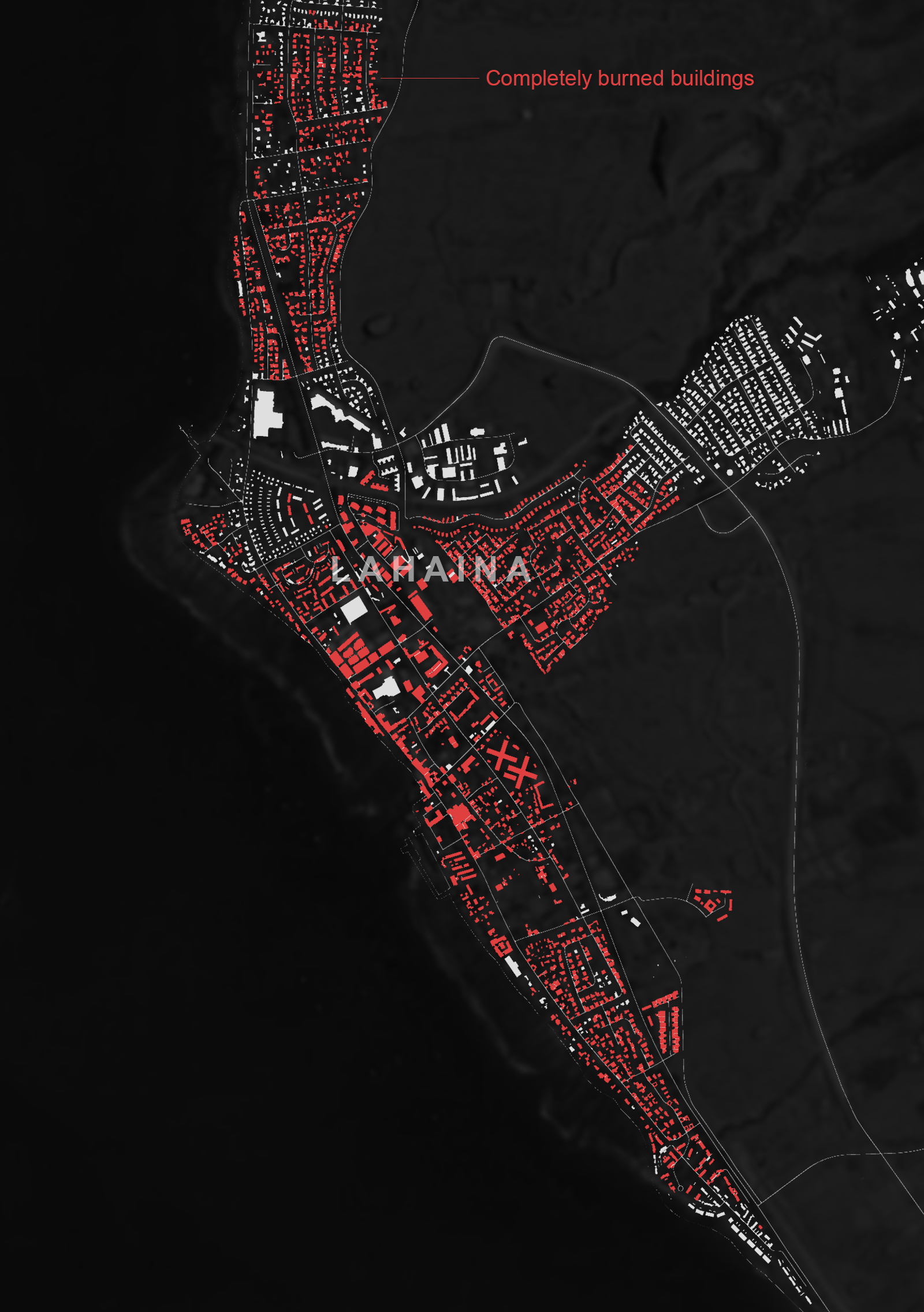
Damaged buildings in the Lahaina area

The main Maui wildfire burned much of the community of Lahaina, where more than 2,200 structures were damaged or destroyed, including much of the downtown Lahaina Historic District centered on Front Street. 96% of burned structures were residential. The 3.4-square-mile area (8.8 km^{2}) was the commercial, residential, and cultural center of the community. On August 17, Governor Green noted that the fire temperature had reached 1,000 °F (538 °C), since it was hot enough to melt granite counters and engine blocks. Puddles of melted aluminum have been seen underneath burned-out vehicles.

Although PDC and FEMA had initially estimated total damage at around $5.52 billion, catastrophe modeling firm Karen Clark & Co. estimated on August 16 that insured property losses would be only $3.2 billion. Real estate experts expressed concern that many Lahaina homes were uninsured or underinsured and surviving owners might not have sufficient financial resources to build new homes in compliance with the state's current building code. Many Native Hawaiians were able to afford to live in Lahaina only because they had inherited paid-off homes from previous generations, and since they had not needed mortgage loans to purchase their homes, they were not required to carry homeowners insurance coverage.

The Lahaina Historic District, which was designated as a National Historic Landmark in 1962 and was the capital of the Kingdom of Hawaii for 35 years, suffered extensive fire damage. Among the structures destroyed were:

- The Waiola Church, which celebrated its 200th anniversary in May 2023, lost its main sanctuary, annex, and social hall. Waiola Church's cemetery is the burial ground for members of the Hawaiian Royal Family, including Queen Keōpūolani, who founded the church in 1823.
- The Lahaina Jodo Mission, a Buddhist temple in northern Lahaina. Established in 1912 and stood on its current location since 1932.
- The Pioneer Inn, a landmark town hotel constructed by George Alan Freeland in 1901.
- The Nā ʻAikāne Cultural Center, a local cultural center which once housed a soup kitchen for striking plantation workers during an International Longshore and Warehouse Union (ILWU) strike against the Pioneer Mill.
- The Old Lahaina Courthouse, which first operated in 1860 as a customs house for trade and whaling ships. The building's roof was completely destroyed. The Old Lahaina Courthouse stands in heavily damaged Lahaina Banyan Court Park.
  - The Lahaina Heritage Museum and its collection, which were housed inside the Old Courthouse building, were also destroyed. The collection included items that spanned Lahaina's history, including artifacts from the area's ancient Hawaiian period, the Hawaiian Kingdom and monarchy, the plantation period, and the town's whaling era. Copies of the museum's documents had been digitized and stored online prior to the fire.
- The Baldwin Home Museum, which was constructed in 1834 and 1835 as the home of American missionaries Dwight Baldwin and Charlotte Fowler Baldwin, burned to the ground. The Baldwin Home was the oldest house on the island of Maui. Historic items lost in the house fire included Baldwin's medical instruments he used to vaccinate much of Maui's population against smallpox in the 1800s, seashell collections, and the family's furniture and rocking chairs from the East Coast.
- The Wo Hing Society Hall, built in the early 1910s to serve the growing Chinese population in Lahaina. It was restored and turned into the Wo Hing Museum in the 1980s.

The fire also destroyed several cell towers in affected areas, causing service outages and 9-1-1 emergency telephone services to be rendered unavailable. The wildfire that burned near the community of Kula, located in Maui's Upcountry, destroyed at least two homes.

The Maria Lanakila Catholic Church in Lahaina, which had been dedicated in 1858. Contrary to early reports, the main church building and steeple were not destroyed and survived the fire largely intact, though the roof and interior may have sustained some damage.

The Lahaina Civic Center, venue for the Maui Invitational Tournament, a prominent early-season college men's basketball event, has so far escaped significant damage, although it had to be evacuated after earlier serving as an evacuation center. The 2023 tournament, scheduled for November, was moved to Honolulu at the Stan Sheriff Center instead.

=== Environment ===
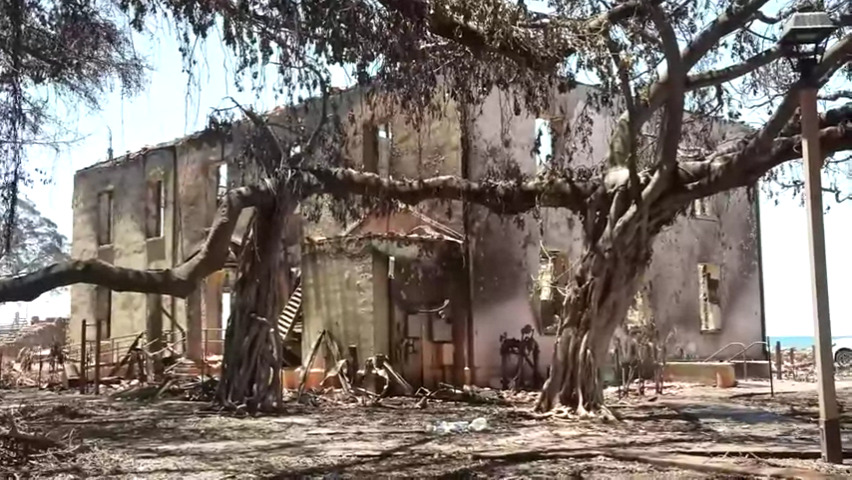
Partial view of the damage to the Lahaina Banyan tree

Lahaina's famous banyan tree, the largest banyan tree in the United States, had most of its foliage charred, though was left standing after the fire. A video taken on August 11 showed local officials watering the tree to aid its recovery. At least some green foliage appeared to be present and the roots, trunks, and branches of the tree were largely undamaged.

On August 11, unsafe water alerts were issued as early as 3 p.m. (01:00 UTC) warning residents of Lahaina and Upper Kula, with instructions to not drink or use tap water for daily activities, even after boiling, and all residents were requested to limit water use. Following earlier deployments on August 9, further potable water tankers were set up at locations across the island. Some scientists have also warned that charred soils, toxic contaminated top soil and other debris could run off into the shoreline and cause marine habitats and coral to be damaged.

=== Evacuations ===
The fires prompted mass evacuations of thousands of residents and visitors from Lāhaina, Kāʻanapali, Kīhei, and Kula. The U.S. Coast Guard confirmed that they had rescued 17 people who had jumped into the sea in Lahaina to escape the fires. As of August 12, more than 1,400 people on Maui remained in shelters. Vacationing San Francisco mayor London Breed was among those evacuated from Maui.

An estimated 11,000 people flew out of Maui via Kahului Airport on August 9, 2023.

American, Southwest, Hawaiian, and Alaska Airlines had added additional flights to their routes into Kahului Airport by August 10 to help evacuate people from the island, and American replaced a narrow-body Airbus A321 with a wide-body Boeing 777 to further boost capacity. All four airlines had also reportedly waived fare cancellation penalties and fare-difference fees for affected passengers, and Hawaiian and Southwest offered temporary $19 interisland flights until August 11. By August 13, 2023, over 46,000 visitors had flown out of Maui via Kahului Airport.

Hawaiian state officials created plans to house visitors along with thousands of displaced Maui residents at the Hawaii Convention Center in Honolulu, Oʻahu and over 100 had stayed as of August 10.

After the fire swept through Lahaina on August 8, Maui County blocked public access to all of West Maui with checkpoints on Route 30/340 (Honoapiʻilani Highway, the only highway in and out of the area). Over the next three days, the blockade created a desperate situation for residents of still-intact communities who ran low on medicine, food, and fuel, while other residents and tourists who suddenly found themselves outside of the blockade wished to retrieve their belongings. On August 11, 2023, the County reopened the checkpoint on Route 30 at Māʻalaea to help ameliorate these issues. Within five hours, the checkpoint was closed again, reportedly because of attempts to enter the sealed-off portion of Lahaina.

On September 25 officials cleared a small area in North Lahaina for reentry, the first time in over 6 weeks that residents had been allowed back into the city. Visiting residents were provided with personal protective equipment and urged not to disturb the ash, which may contain hazardous materials such as asbestos and lead.

=== Wildlife and pets ===
The Maui Humane Society stated that there were an estimated 3,000 animals from Lahaina that were missing after the fires as of August 16. As of August 14, the society had received about 367 lost animal reports and some dual reported with the society and on the "Missing Pets of Maui" Facebook page created by the society which has about 6,400 members. Any found animals are checked for any identification and scanned for a microchip, with the society urging that found deceased animals should not be moved or destroyed so that they can be cataloged and checked for any identification.

Animal welfare advocates and the Maui Police were working in tandem to search the burned areas for lost, injured or deceased animals, with dozens of feeding and drinking stations set up to draw out animals. To make room for animals impacted by the fires, the Humane Society, and the only open-admission animal shelter on the island airlifted over 100 shelter animals to Portland, Oregon. Veterinarians and staff members of the Kīhei Veterinary Clinic, the Humane Society, the Central Maui Animal Clinic, and volunteers coordinated care for the found animals and disbursed free medical care, food, and animal medication to island residents. Donations and care were also extended to the Maui Police Department's K-9 unit which worked with recovery efforts and housing for the animals.

Scientists with the National Science Foundation and the Environmental Protection Agency (EPA) began to prep for studies that would monitor and document any changes in water quality due to soil erosion and other effects of the fire that can affect the island's waterways and ecosystems. Others expressed thanks that areas such as the Maui Bird Conservation Center was spared from the majority of the fires, as it housed a large portion of the alalā flock.

== Legal proceedings ==
Within two weeks of the Maui wildfires, lawyers from California, Florida, Oregon, Texas, and Washington came to Maui to sign up wildfire victims as plaintiffs. The state's primary lawyer regulator, Chief Disciplinary Counsel Bradley Tamm, warned Hawaiians to be careful: "It's a feeding frenzy. There are sharks both in the water and on the land". Hawaiian Electric Industries Inc., the primary electric utility for Maui, became a significant focus of such litigation. By August 14, at least one lawsuit was filed against Hawaiian Electric, and its stock value declined.

On August 9, 2023, a deputy attorney general representing the Board of Land and Natural Resources filed a petition for a writ of mandamus to the Hawaiʻi Supreme Court, alleging that a Hawaii circuit court judge's rulings regarding private water usage had restricted the amount of water available to fight the fires. This claim was disputed by the responding Sierra Club, who requested the Supreme Court to sanction the Attorney General for filing the petition under false pretenses. The attorney representing Maui County stated during the hearing that a lack of water was never an issue during the wildfires. The Supreme Court denied the petition.

On October 4, 2023, a filing with the Hawaii Public Utilities Commission showed that Hawaiian Electric was underinsured against its potential liability exposure for the Maui wildfires, with only about $165 million in liability insurance coverage. According to ALM's Law.com, as of October 5, 2023, more than 35 lawsuits had been filed against Hawaiian Electric and other defendants. Most but not all had been filed in Hawaii state circuit courts, especially the Second Circuit based in Wailuku (which has jurisdiction over Maui County). In response, Hawaiian Electric retained California law firm Munger, Tolles & Olson as its lead defense counsel. The same law firm had previously worked for Pacific Gas and Electric on litigation arising out of the 2018 California wildfires, in which its attorneys had billed their time in 2019 at rates between $400 and $1,400 per hour.

On March 11, 2024, U.S. District Judge Jill Otake ordered the remand of 90 lawsuits back to state court. The defendants had removed the cases to the federal district court in Honolulu under a 2002 law which authorized federal jurisdiction over civil actions arising out of the deaths of at least 75 natural persons at a "discrete location". Judge Otake held that the Lahaina fire was not a "discrete location" because the fatalities were spread out over seven square miles (18.1 km^{2}).

In July 2024, a tentative agreement was reached and Hawaiian Electric Industries, along with the State of Hawaii, Maui County, Kamehameha Schools and others would agree to pay thousands of plaintiffs and victims over $4 billion to settle the lawsuits. A state circuit judge asserted he had the judicial right to end an impasse over who will have priority on payments – victims or the insurers. The order said although the insurance companies have a separate subrogation suit in Honolulu, the Maui court has the jurisdiction to resolve the issue to reach a "...just, efficient and economic determination of all the Maui Fire Cases." The judge scheduled a "status conference" for August 2024 to determine the cause of the issues and resolve them.

== Response ==
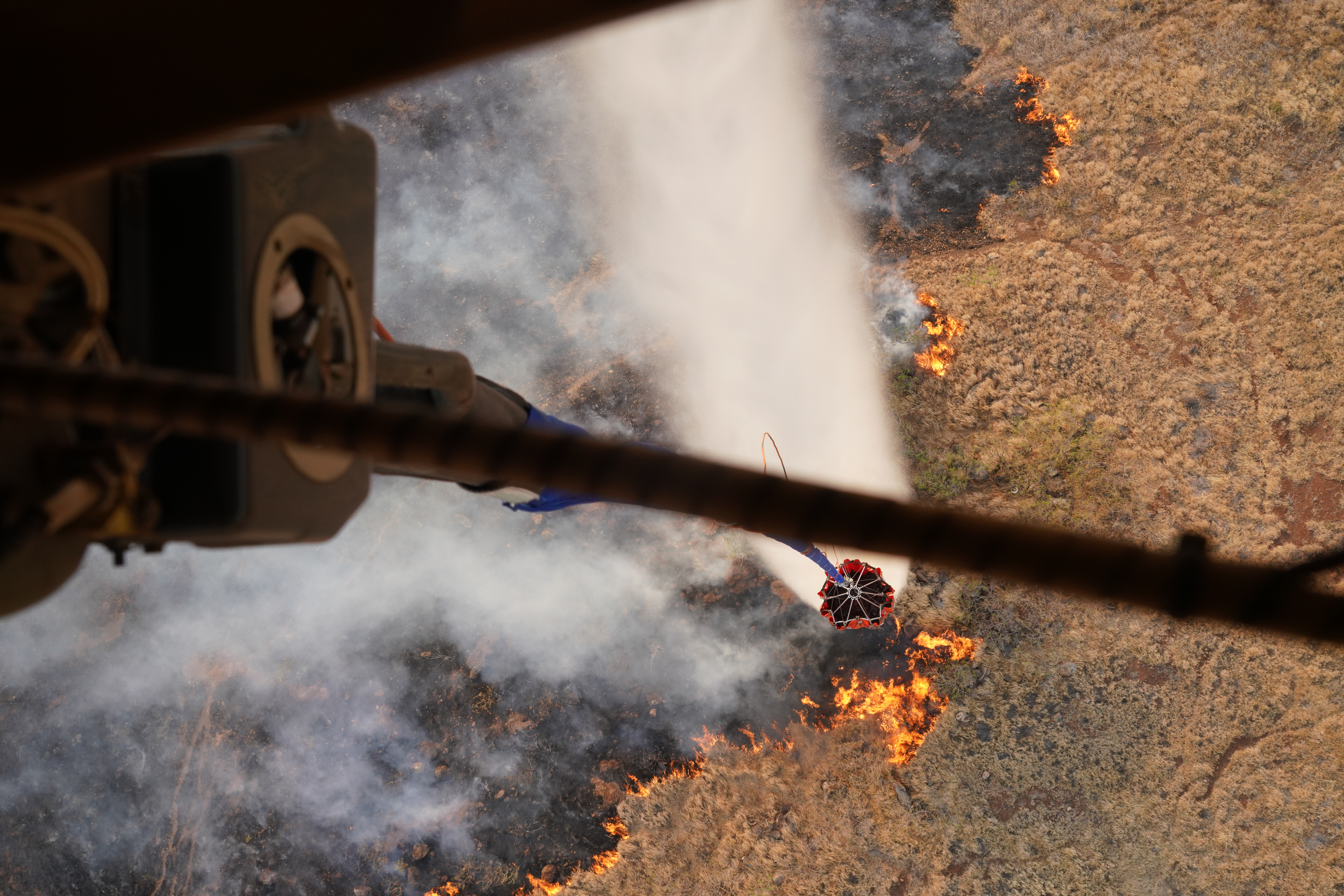
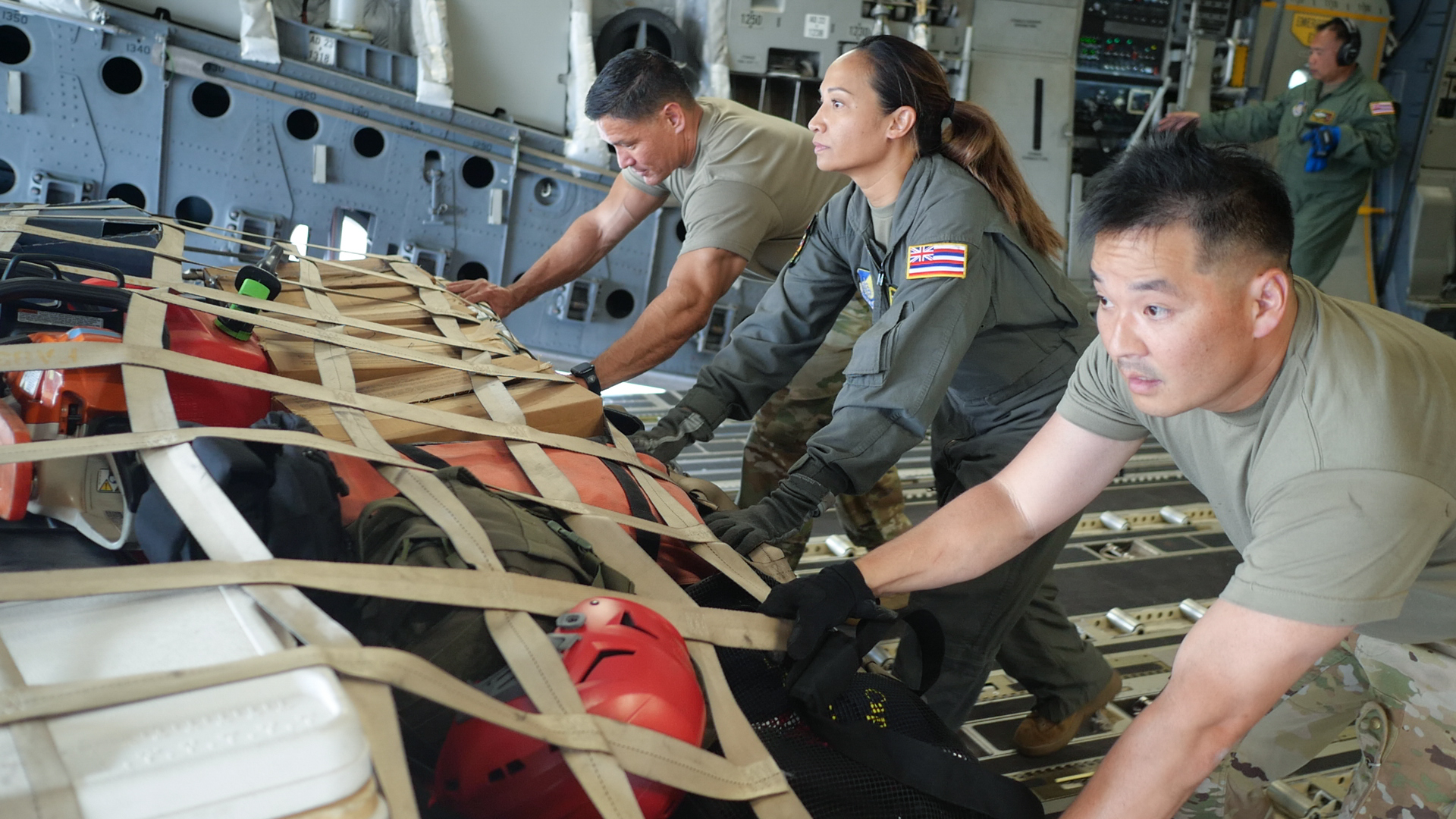
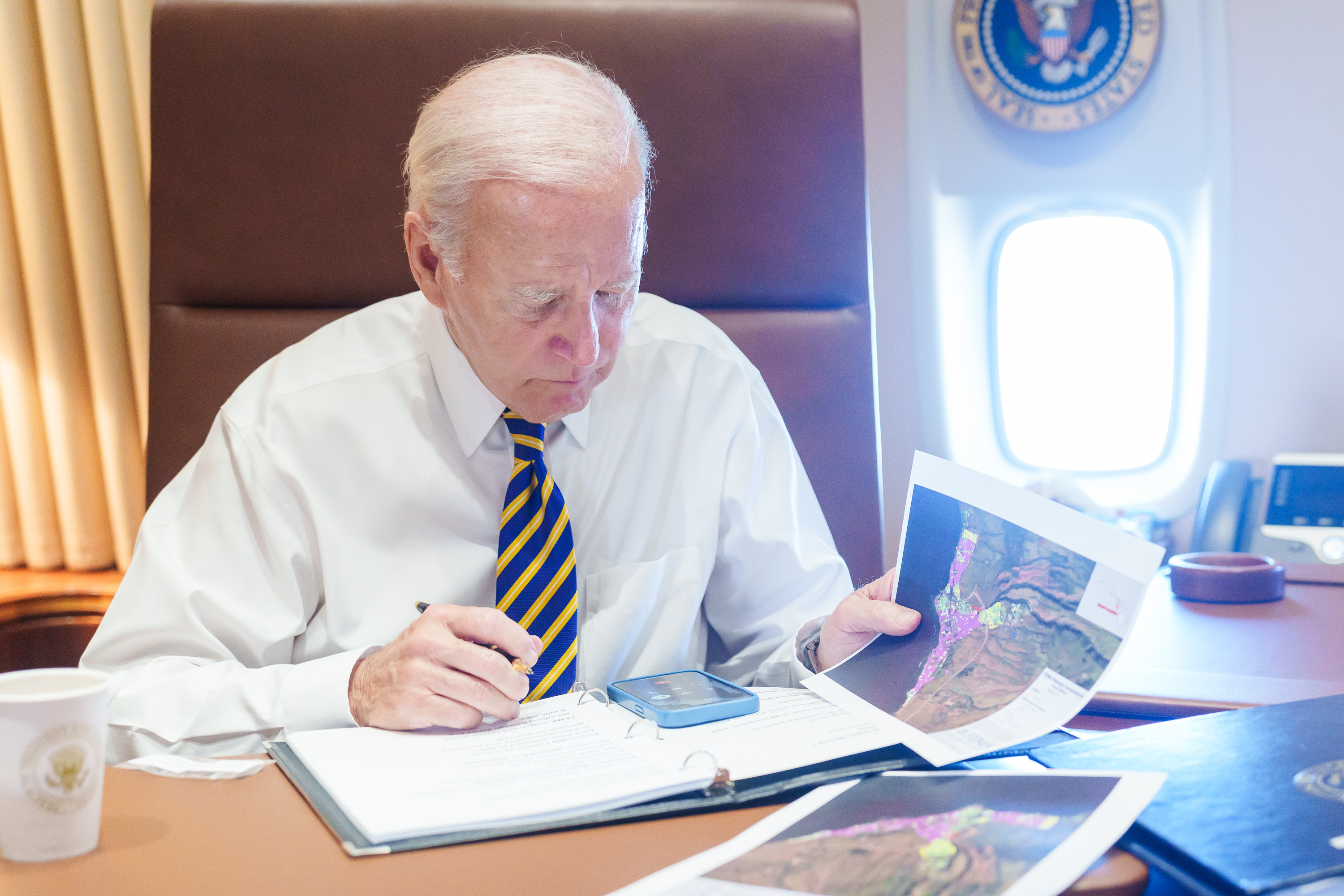
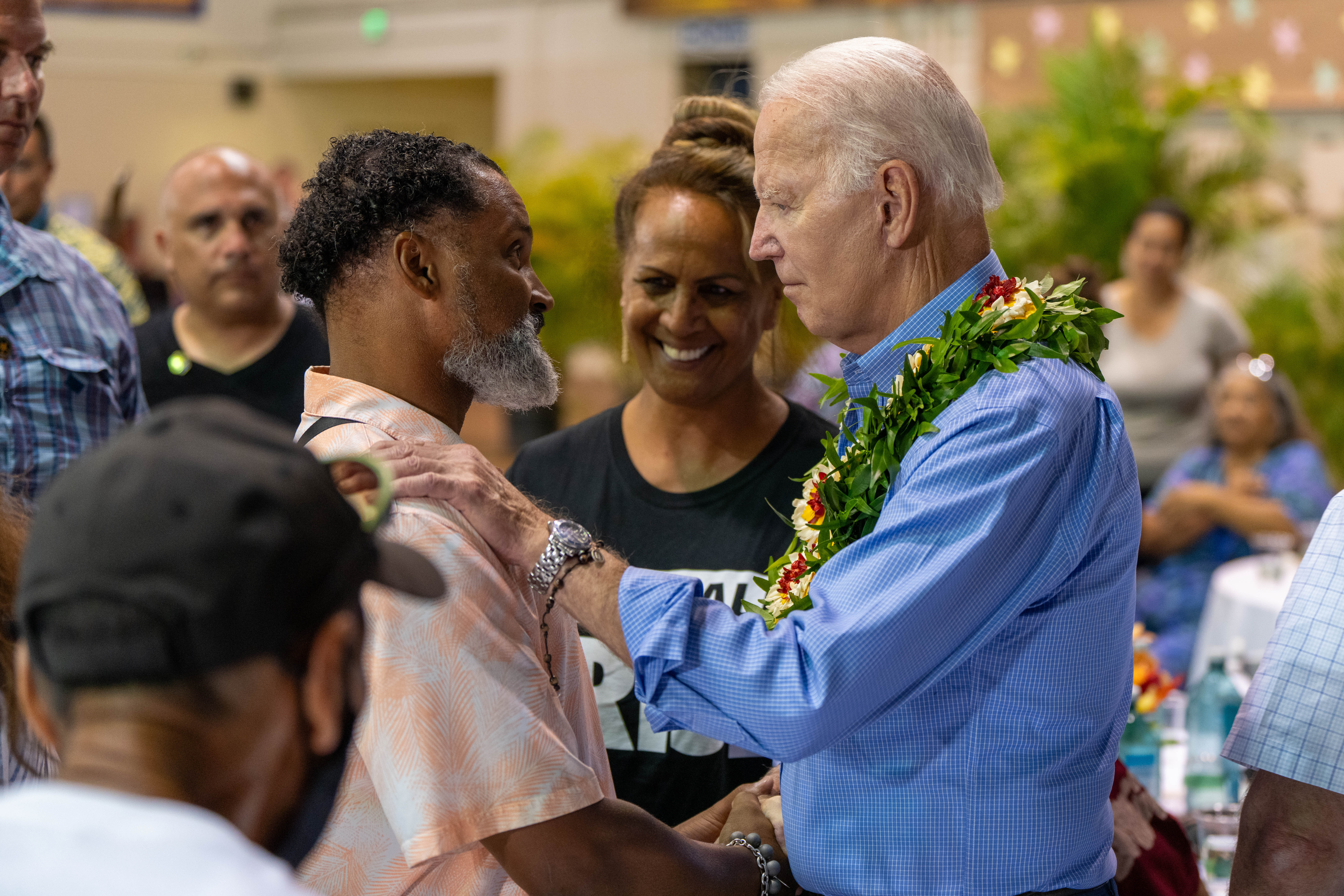
Top to bottom:
Aug. 9: Hawaii Army National Guard Chinook drops water on the wildfire
Aug. 10: Hawaii Air National Guard offload supplies from a C-17 Globemaster III
Aug. 12: FEMA video footage of response and recovery
Aug 15: President Biden reviews a FEMA-provided map aboard Air Force One
Aug. 21: President Biden visits Maui and speaks at Lahaina Civic Center

=== Federal government ===
U.S. President Joe Biden ordered the mobilization of "all available federal assets" to help respond to the wildfires. In a statement, Biden noted that the United States Navy Third Fleet and the United States Coast Guard were supporting "response and rescue efforts". The United States Department of Transportation was working with commercial airlines to help evacuate tourists from Maui. To help with the ongoing Coast Guard search and rescue operation, the United States Navy sent in Helicopter Maritime Strike Squadron Three Seven (HSM-37) and two MH-60R Seahawk helicopters, with the United States Indo-Pacific Command standing ready to provide additional assistance as needed. Meanwhile, the U.S. 25th Infantry Division from Schofield Barracks on Oʻahu was deployed alongside the Hawaii National Guard to Maui and Hawaii Island to assist with fire suppression support, search and rescue operations, and traffic control.

Using data provided by FEMA's Response Geospatial Office, with assistance from the Civil Air Patrol's Geospatial Program's Damage Assessment Team, President Biden approved the state of Hawaii's request for a major disaster declaration on August 10, making federal funding available for recovery efforts in the affected areas. On August 10, FEMA initiated deployment of Urban Search and Rescue Task Force personnel from around the United States to Maui. Washington State Task Force 1 sent 45 specialists along with a 5-member K-9 team. Each human member of the K-9 team works with a canine partner, a FEMA-certified human remains detection dog. The same task force had previously deployed to Maui in 2018 to assist with the aftermath of Hurricane Lane. On August 10, Nevada Task Force 1 was initially asked to send one K-9 handler and dog, who left that same day. The request was amended to four more specialists, then on top of that, a full 45-member task force team, all of whom flew out on August 11.

FEMA initially provided $700 payments as one of several types of federal assistance available to survivors of the wildfire, which was meant to address immediate needs such as food, water, and clothing.

California sent 11 members of Urban Search and Rescue task forces based in the cities of Sacramento, Riverside, and Oakland, and six employees of the California Governor's Office of Emergency Services. On August 15, California announced that it was increasing its deployment to 101 people, including an incident management team of 67 Cal Fire employees. Among the new personnel arriving on Maui were forensic anthropologists from Chico State who had helped identify victims of the Camp Fire (2018).

By August 16, the number of FEMA cadaver dogs deployed to the scene had increased to 40, and Governor Green explained that the searchers were in a "race against time" to recover remains before they could be degraded by the next rainstorm. Each dog could only work for about 15 to 20 minutes in the tropical heat before rotating into an air-conditioned truck to cool down. The dogs also had to wear booties to shield their paws from asphalt temperatures exceeding 150 °F (66 °C) and still-hot embers, but the booties themselves required frequent replacement.

Meanwhile, on August 15, a federal Disaster Mortuary Operational Response Team (DMORT) arrived on the island to assist with the identification and processing of the large number of remains. The DMORT brought along a portable morgue in the form of 22.5 short tons (20,400 kg) of equipment and supplies, and nine Matson shipping containers were seen outside the Maui Police Department's Forensic Facility in Wailuku.

On August 17, a five-member National Response Team from the Bureau of Alcohol, Tobacco, Firearms and Explosives arrived on Maui to investigate the cause and origin of the Lahaina fire. The team included an electrical engineer from the Fire Research Laboratory.

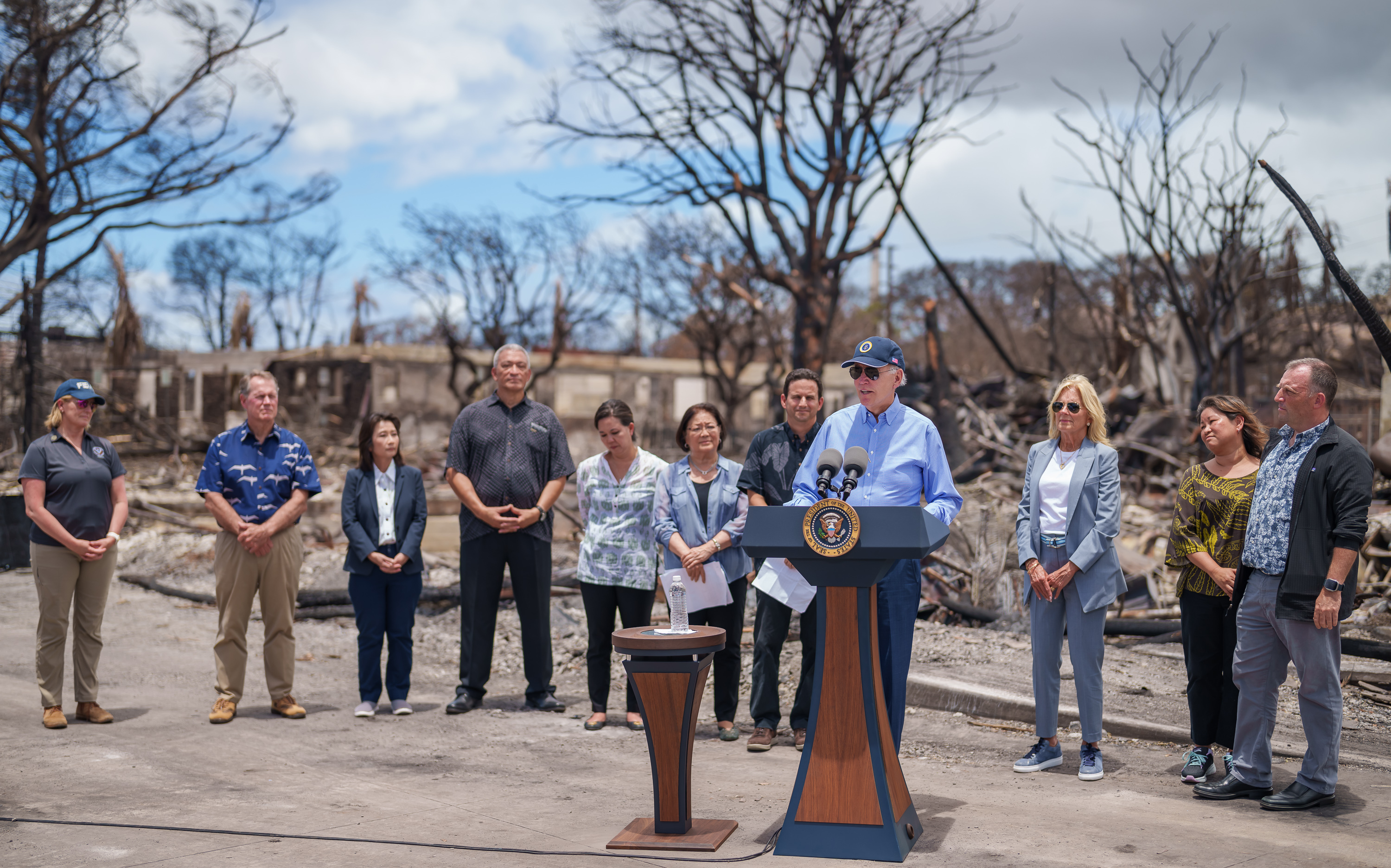
President Joe Biden delivers remarks at Lahaina Banyan Tree Park after surveying damage from the deadly wildfires.

On August 21, President Biden and First Lady Jill Biden arrived at Kahului Airport, where they met with Governor Josh Green, his wife Jaime, as well as members of Hawaii's congressional delegation. The Bidens then boarded Marine One where they were given an aerial tour of the devastation. Biden then went to Lahaina where he met with first responders as well as local and state officials and FEMA administrator Deanne Criswell. The Bidens walked through the ruins of the town seeing the area firsthand. They also took part in a blessing by island elders. Biden then spoke to the community and met with survivors at the Lahaina Civic Center.

By August 25, the FEMA Urban Search and Rescue task forces had searched 99% of the disaster area, and they wrapped up their work and returned home to the mainland United States.

During 2023, Environmental Protection Agency (EPA) hazardous waste disposal crew removed more than 200 tonnes of hazardous materials from more than 1,400 properties in areas affected by the fire and a soil stabiliser was placed to stop ash and debris from moving off properties as a result of wind or surface water runoff. Furthermore, almost 30 tonnes of lithium batteries from 274 power walls and 94 electric and hybrid cars were securely gathered from the affected region and transported out of Maui for recycling.

=== State government ===
Hawaii Lieutenant Governor Sylvia Luke, who was serving as acting governor in the absence of Governor Josh Green while he was traveling outside of Hawaii, issued an emergency proclamation and activated the Hawaii National Guard. The Hawaii National Guard, together with the U.S. 25th Infantry Division from Schofield Barracks on Oʻahu, deployed to Maui and Hawaii Island to assist with fire suppression support, search and rescue operations, and traffic control. Two UH-60 Blackhawk and one CH-47 Chinook helicopters were also deployed to support fire suppression efforts.

As of August 9, 2023, the Hawaii Tourism Authority was asking all visitors on Maui for non-essential travel to leave the island and strongly discouraged any further non-essential travel to the island.

Previously closed to prioritize emergency services, access to West Maui via Honoapiʻilani Highway for residents with proof of residency and visitors with proof of hotel reservations was resumed beginning at 12 p.m. (UTC 22:00) on August 11. However, at 4 p.m. (UTC 02:00) access was again restricted due to reports of people accessing restricted areas despite hazardous conditions. Access was reopened the following day through Waihee (from the north) only.

On August 11, Hawaii Attorney General Anne Lopez announced that her department would conduct a "comprehensive review of critical decision-making and standing policies" surrounding the wildfires.

On August 16, Governor Josh Green announced his intention to create a moratorium on the sale of land damaged and destroyed by the fires. While acknowledging there may be legal challenges to such a moratorium, he asked "please don't approach them with an offer to buy land. Please don't approach their families to tell them that they are going to be better off if they make a deal, because we're not going to allow it."

On August 31, Attorney General Lopez disclosed in an interview that her office had hired UL's Fire Safety Research Institute to conduct an independent investigation on behalf of the state government, and the UL investigators had been on scene on Maui since August 24.

In the course of an inquiry, the Attorney General's Department and Fire Safety Research Institute (FSRI) acquired papers, audio data, video files, and photos related to the wildfires and in order for everyone in Hawaiʻi to benefit from the source documents about the tragedy, the Department offered free access to this database as a public service.

All residents of the state of Hawai‘i continue to have access to live video and audio telehealth appointments with a psychologist, psychiatrist, family medicine specialists, mental health counsellors, and/or substance abuse counsellors through 2026, with an emphasis on older adults, Native Hawaiian, and Pacific Islander communities via a webcam with Internet connectivity.

On April 4, 2024, two months after the end of the eviction moratorium in Maui, Governor Josh Green announced that a portion of areas affected would be prioritized for the restoration of historic wetlands and aquaculture after having been drained and filled during the era of sugar plantations in Hawaii.

=== International assistance ===
==== Japan ====
Japan pledged $2 million of aid, with $1.5 million given to the American Red Cross and $500,000 given to the Tokyo-based nonprofit organization Japan Platform.

==== South Korea ====
South Korea pledged $2 million of aid in support relief efforts. The pledge included a $1.5 million donation to the Hawaiʻi Community Foundation and $500,000 of supplies purchased from local Korean markets.

==== Taiwan ====
The Taipei Economic and Cultural Representative Office in Honolulu announced a $500,000 cash donation to the Hawaiʻi Community Foundation to support relief efforts.

==== Hungary ====
A container city on the island of Maui is being built from foldable container units.

=== Fundraising and donations ===
Due to multiple GoFundMe fundraising efforts for those that were affected by the fires, the site put together a hub to gather all of the verified fundraisers, and added that by August 18 there had been more than 250,000 donors and $30 million raised through the site for those affected. Other organizations, communities and businesses across the United States held donation drives and fundraisers where proceeds and the items would be donated to specific nonprofits or groups. All twelve professional sports teams from the Los Angeles area donated $450,000 to relief efforts. In addition, proceeds from the October 8 preseason game at the Stan Sheriff Center in Honolulu between the Los Angeles Clippers and the Utah Jazz will go towards the Maui Strong Fund. Oprah Winfrey distributed pillows, diapers and other supplies to survivors of the devastating fire and, with Dwayne “The Rock” Johnson, set up the People’s Fund of Maui, personally donating $25 million of her own towards the cause.

The Hawaiian Mission Houses Archives has uploaded items to their digitization project relevant to Lahaina's history such as photos, journals, drawings, and letters to aid in the recovery of historic sites.

=== Concerns about preparedness ===
A lack of adequate warning and preparation has also come into focus. Despite Hawaii's advanced integrated outdoor siren warning system, on Maui, 80 of these sirens, designed for tsunamis and other disasters, remained silent as the fires burned. The Hawaii Emergency Management Agency attributed this to the fires' rapid progression and existing ground response coordination. And while residents received other alerts, such as mobile phone notifications, the intensity and urgency of these messages were deemed insufficient. At least one analyst compared them unfavorably to high-priority tsunami warnings, suggesting a possible alarm fatigue among residents, where frequent, less urgent alerts can diminish the perceived significance of real threats. The administrator of the Maui County Emergency Management Agency, Herman Andaya, defended the decision not to activate the emergency sirens in an August 16 press conference; he argued that the outdoor sirens exist only on the coastline and are normally used to warn residents to flee tsunamis by heading to the mountainside, which would have sent them straight into the fire. Andaya resigned the next day effective immediately, citing health reasons.

The Lahaina wildfires also exposed gaps in the state's wildfire preparedness. In a 2021 report, Hawaii officials ranked wildfire risk as "low" despite increasing fire acreage and dangers from drought and non-native grasses. The report criticized inadequate funding and lack of fire prevention strategies. Previous wildfires served as a warning, but risks were not adequately addressed. Hawaii's fire management budgets had not kept pace with growing threats, according to the Hawaii Wildfire Management Organization. Non-native, flammable grasses remained widespread, increasing fire risk. The climatologist Abby Frazier emphasized Hawaii's extreme wildfire vulnerability and called for more serious fire prevention efforts. The 2021 Maui County report had recommended fire hazard risk assessment and replacing non-native grasses, but it is unclear if these recommendations were implemented.

A state official for the Hawaii Department of Land and Natural Resources delayed the request of the release of water by the West Maui Land Co. to protect its holdings until it was too late. In early September, it was reported that residents of numerous communities around the state of Hawaii had become deeply worried about the risk of losing their own homes to wildfires, after seeing how Lahaina had been so suddenly destroyed.

==== New warning programs ====
In July 2024, Hawaiian Electric implemented its first public safety power shutoff plan (PSPS) by identifying fire-prone areas on each island whose history of fires, winds, dry vegetation levels and other factors put them at risk. A PSPS might be issued because of drought, high winds (40-50 mph) and low humidity by broadcasting messages on the PSPS at least 24 hrs. in advance. In the rest of the US wildfire vulnerable areas, particularly in California, PSPS plans have been implemented. Hawaiian Electric also began the installation of 52 weather stations on four islands: 23 on Maui, 15 on Hawaiʻi Island, 12 on O'ahu and two on Moloka'I in fire- susceptible areas to more effectively predict and react to wildfires. The solar-powered stations provide temperature, humidity and wind data that will help determine whether the utility should actuate a public safety power shutoff (PSPS). The meteorological data will be shared with the National Weather Service and other weather forecasters to better predict fire risks state-wide. About half of the $1.7 million invested in the project will be paid through the US Infrastructure Investment and Jobs Act.

=== Conspiracy theories ===
Following the fires, a variety of conspiracy theories about them were posted to social media, notably by far-right conspiracy theorist Stew Peters. Some contained doctored images or images and videos of other unrelated events presented as being from the fires, often ostensibly demonstrating that a directed-energy weapon or "space laser" was involved. There have also been mentions of famous individuals' estates in Hawaii that have not been damaged from the fires, prompting unsubstantiated accusations of blame. Other posts have claimed that wildfires do not occur naturally or that vegetation is not left standing in a natural fire. Real Raw News, a fake news website, promoted falsehoods about U.S. Marines attacking a FEMA convoy fleeing the wildfires and arresting FEMA deputy administrator Erik Hooks.

Researchers from Microsoft, Recorded Future, the RAND Corporation, NewsGuard and the University of Maryland found that a Chinese government-directed disinformation campaign used the disaster to attempt to sow discord in the US. Lahaina residents were discouraged from going to the agencies for assistance by disinformation from people who regularly spread Russian propaganda.

== See also ==
- 2023 Canadian wildfires
- 2023 Greece wildfires
- 2023 United States wildfires
- January 2025 Southern California wildfires
- List of wildfires in the United States
- Utility-caused wildfires
- Wildfires in the United States
