= Lāhainā Jodo Mission =

Buddhist Temple in Lahaina, Hawaii

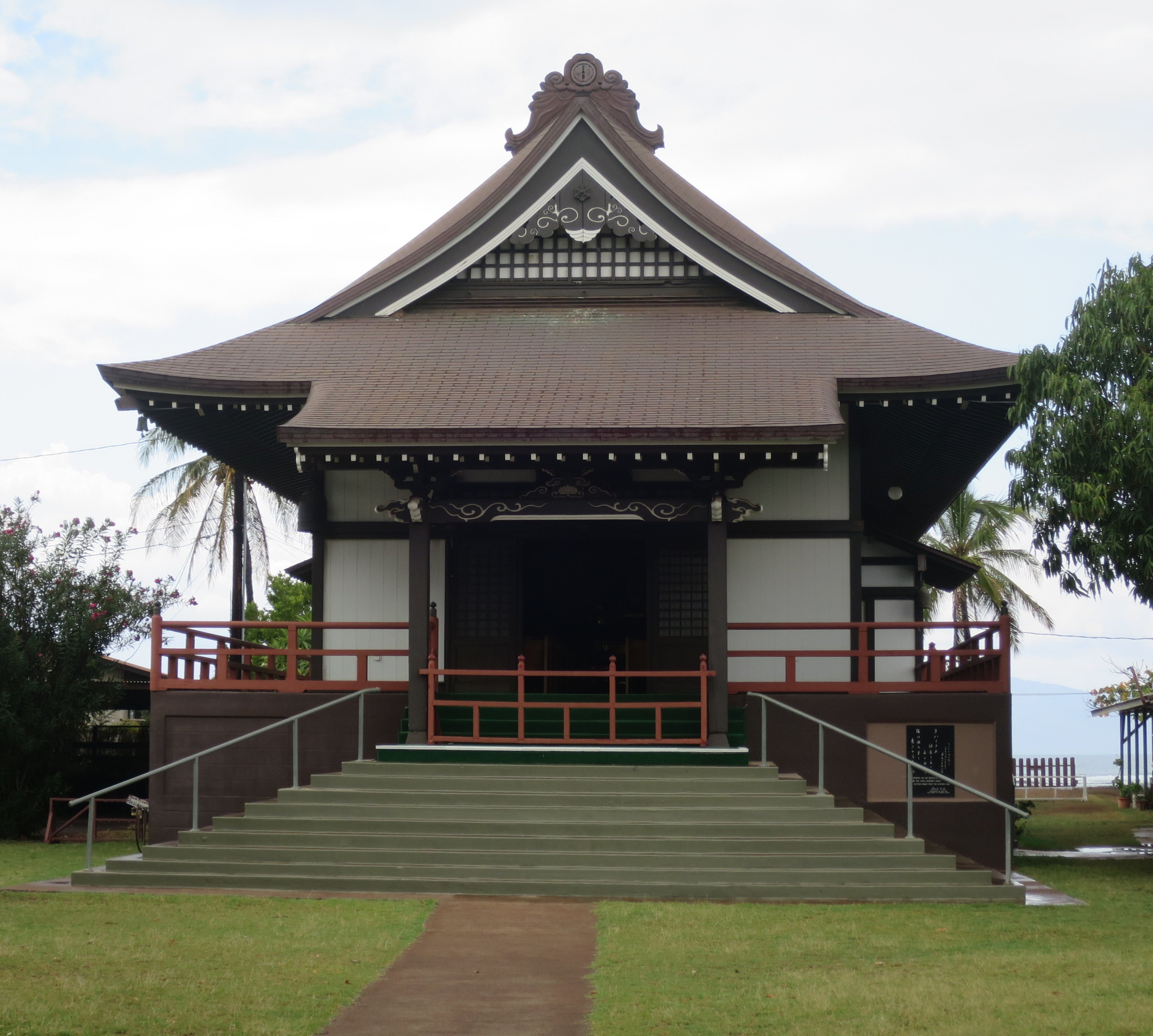
- The temple (2016) which was destroyed in the 2023 Hawaii wildfires

Religion
- Affiliation: Buddhism
- Ecclesiastical or organizational status: active

Location
- Location: Lahaina, Hawaii
- Interactive map of Lāhainā Jodo Mission
- Coordinates: 20.882879°N 156.687246°W

Architecture
- Type: Buddhist Temple
- Style: Japanese architecture
- Completed: 1912
- Destroyed: 2023

The Lāhainā Jodo Mission is a historic Jōdo-shū Buddhist Temple in Lāhainā, Hawaii.

== History ==
The temple was established in 1912 and stood on its current location since 1932.

In 1968, the temple had a 12-foot-high (3.7 m) statue of the Amida Buddha installed for the centenary of the first Japanese people coming in Hawaii.

On July 1, 2023, the temple celebrated their first public Obon Festival since the COVID-19 pandemic in Hawaii.

Many of the temple's buildings were damaged or destroyed in the 2023 Hawaii wildfires, though the Amida Buddha statue survived. The Jodo Mission of Hawaii, located on the island of Oʻahu, held a fundraiser for their Lāhainā location at their Obon Festival.
