= List of shipwrecks in 2005 =

The list of shipwrecks in 2005 includes ships sunk, foundered, grounded, or otherwise lost during 2005.

table of contents
2005
Jan	Feb	Mar	Apr
May	Jun	Jul	Aug
Sep	Oct	Nov	Dec
Unknown date

== January ==
=== 9 January ===
List of shipwrecks: 9 January 2005
Ship	State	Description
Bay King	United States	The retired 96-foot (29.3 m) tug was scuttled as an artificial reef in the North Atlantic Ocean 2 nautical miles (3.7 km; 2.3 mi) off Mantoloking, New Jersey, in 80 feet (24 m) of water at 40°03.187′N 073°59.283′W.
Megan Sue	United States	The retired 75-foot (22.9 m) tug was scuttled as an artificial reef in the North Atlantic Ocean 2 nautical miles (3.7 km; 2.3 mi) off Mantoloking, New Jersey, in 80 feet (24 m) of water at 40°03.181′N 073°59.310′W.

=== 15 January ===
List of shipwrecks: 15 January 2005
Ship	State	Description
Big Valley	United States	The fishing vessel capsized and sank with the loss of five lives in the Bering Sea approximately 78 nautical miles (144 km; 90 mi) west of Saint Paul Island. Her sole survivor was rescued from a life raft.

== February ==
=== 7 February ===
List of shipwrecks: 7 February 2005
Ship	State	Description
Jökulfell	Isle of Man	The cargo ship sank in the Atlantic Ocean 60 nautical miles (110 km) north of the Faroe Islands with the loss of six of her eleven crew.

=== 9 February ===
List of shipwrecks: 9 February 2005
Ship	State	Description
Adriana	United States	After her reduction gear failed, the 50-foot (15.2 m) salmon seiner drifted ashore and was broken to pieces by the surf approximately 50 yards (46 m) off Cape Trinity (56°44′50″N 154°08′30″W) on the south end of Alaska′s Kodiak Island. Her crew of a four and a dog that was on board reached shore safely; a second dog perished.

=== 22 February ===
List of shipwrecks: 22 February 2005
Ship	State	Description
Siempre Casina	Portugal	The 21-metre (68.9 ft) fishing vessel sank in the Bay of Biscay off the coast of Ribadeo, Spain. Eight crew died and one was rescued. Raised, repaired, and returned to service.

== March ==
=== 15 March ===
List of shipwrecks: 15 March 2005
Ship	State	Description
Rocky Pass	United States	The 19-foot (5.8 m) troller disappeared during a voyage from Kelp Bay (57.2982°N 134.8658°W) to Angoon, Alaska. The bodies of her two crewmen were found at Point Wilson (57°08′05″N 134°38′00″W) on Admiralty Island in the Alexander Archipelago in Southeast Alaska.

=== 23 March ===
List of shipwrecks: 23 March 2005
Ship	State	Description
Oban	United States	The 46-foot (14.0 m) seiner was wrecked on the southwest corner of Duke Island in the Gravina Islands of the Alexander Archipelago in Southeast Alaska. Her crew of two survived and abandoned ship into a Metlakatla Fire Department skiff, which transferred them to the vessel Skip Jack (United States).

=== 25 March ===
List of shipwrecks: 25 March 2005
Ship	State	Description
Irving Johnson	United States	Irving Johnson aground The schooner ran aground at Channel Islands harbor, California. She was later refloated; there were no casualties.

== April ==
=== 11 April ===
List of shipwrecks: 11 April 2005
Ship	State	Description
Almirante Lattore	Chilean Navy	The decommissioned County-class destroyer sank in the southeastern Pacific Ocean off the coast of Chile at (35°58′S 077°22′W) while under tow to the shipbreakers.

=== 16 April ===
List of shipwrecks: 16 April 2005
Ship	State	Description
Maelstrom	United States	The retired 71-foot (21.6 m) lobster-fishing boat was scuttled as an artificial reef in the North Atlantic Ocean off Wildwood, New Jersey, at 38°57.412′N 074°41.346′W.

=== 22 April ===
List of shipwrecks: 22 April 2005
Ship	State	Description
SAS Shaka	South African Navy	The decommissioned Warrior-class strike craft was sunk as a target by an MM40 Excoet anti-ship missile fired by the frigate SAS Amatola (South African Navy).
Tania Dee	United States	The 38-foot (11.6 m) longline halibut-fishing vessel sank in the Gulf of Alaska off Cape Ommaney (56°10′00″N 134°40′20″W) in Southeast Alaska. Her two-man crew abandoned ship in survival suits; one was rescued by the fishing vessel Christina and survived, but the other died after being picked up by a United States Coast Guard Sikorsky MH-60 Jayhawk helicopter.

== May ==
=== 4 May ===
List of shipwrecks: 4 May 2005
Ship	State	Description
Lollipop	United States	The retired 62-foot (18.9 m) excursion boat was scuttled as an artificial reef in the North Atlantic Ocean 5.1 nautical miles (9.4 km; 5.9 mi) off Spray Beach, New Jersey, at 39°33.661′N 074°06.204′W.

=== 14 May ===
List of shipwrecks: 14 May 2005
Ship	State	Description
USS America	United States Navy	After four weeks of use as a target for weapons testing, the decommissioned Kitty Hawk-class aircraft carrier was scuttled about 250 nautical miles (460 kilometres) southeast of Cape Hatteras, North Carolina, at 33°09′09″N 071°39′07″W.

=== 15 May ===
List of shipwrecks: 15 May 2005
Ship	State	Description
Heather Kay	United States	The 24-gross ton, 43.9-foot (13.4 m) longline halibut-fishing vessel was destroyed by fire in the Gulf of Alaska east-southeast of Ugak Island (57.6319°N 152.1583°W) in the Kodiak Archipelago, approximately 52 nautical miles (96 km; 60 mi) southeast of Kodiak, Alaska. A United States Coast Guard helicopter rescued her crew of four from a life raft.
Prince	Bangladesh	The motor ferry capsized and sank in deep water near Golapchipa, about 25 miles (40 km) east of Patuakhali, Bangladesh.

=== 17 May ===
List of shipwrecks: 17 May 2005
Ship	State	Description
USS YO-153	United States Navy	The decommissioned 156-foot (47.5 m), 1,000-displacement ton yard fuel oil barge was scuttled as an artificial reef in the North Atlantic Ocean 6.5 nautical miles (12.0 km; 7.5 mi) off Harvey Cedars, New Jersey, in 80 feet (24 m) of water at 39°37.856′N 074°00.986′W. Her sunken wreck was named "Helis."

=== 19 May ===
List of shipwrecks: 19 May 2005
Ship	State	Description
USS Guadalcanal	United States Navy	The decommissioned Iwo Jima-class amphibious assault ship was sunk as a target.

== June ==
=== 6 June ===
List of shipwrecks: 6 June 2005
Ship	State	Description
Faiz	India	The cargo ship was reported missing on 30 May. Located abandoned and ablaze on 2 June 150 nautical miles (280 km; 170 mi) from Haldia, India. Ten survivors were rescued from a lifeboat by the Indian Coast Guard that day. The captain, his wife and their two children died on board. Her chief officer, who had jumped overboard, also died. The cargo ship was taken under tow on 6 June but the towline parted in a storm and she presumably sank.

=== 16 June ===
List of shipwrecks: 16 June 2005
Ship	State	Description
USS Mount Vernon	United States Navy	The decommissioned Thomaston-class dock landing ship was sunk as a target in the Pacific Ocean northwest of Kauai, Hawaii, by P-3 Orion aircraft of Patrol Squadron 1 (VP-1), Patrol Squadron 9 (VP-9), Patrol Squadron 46 (VP-46), and Patrol Squadron 47 (VP-47) (all United States Navy) using Harpoon missiles, Maverick missiles, and bombs.

=== 22 June ===
List of shipwrecks: 22 June 2005
Ship	State	Description
USS Elliot	United States Navy	The decommissioned Spruance-class destroyer was sunk as a target in the Coral Sea about 100 nautical miles (190 kilometres) east of Fraser Island, Queensland, Australia, at 24°43′S 155°50′E as part of Exercise Talisman Sabre.

=== 23 June ===
List of shipwrecks: 23 June 2005
Ship	State	Description
USS William H. Standley	United States Navy	The decommissioned Belknap-class guided-missile cruiser was sunk as a target in the Coral Sea about 100 nautical miles (190 kilometres) east of Fraser Island, Queensland, Australia, at 24°47′S 155°48′E as part of Exercise Talisman Sabre.

== July ==
=== 2 July ===
List of shipwrecks: 2 July 2005
Ship	State	Description
Casitas	United States	MV Casitas aground on 4 August 2005. The National Oceanic and Atmospheric Administration-chartered 145-foot (44 m) research vessel ran aground without loss of life on the north end of Pearl and Hermes Atoll in the Northwestern Hawaiian Islands. She was refloated, towed to a site in the Pacific Ocean northwest of the atoll, and scuttled on 4 August 2005.

=== 31 July ===
List of shipwrecks: 31 July 2005
Ship	State	Description
HMAS Brisbane	Royal Australian Navy	The decommissioned Perth-class guided missile destroyer was sunk for use as a dive wreck approximately 2.8 nautical miles (5.2 kilometres; 3.2 miles) off Mudjimba, Queensland, Australia.

== August ==
=== 3 August ===
List of shipwrecks: 3 August 2005
Ship	State	Description
Elizabeth	United States	The retired 200-foot (61.0 m), 1,016-gross register ton ferry – which had more recently served as a floating restaurant – was scuttled as an artificial reef in the North Atlantic Ocean off Cape May, New Jersey, in 75 feet (23 m) of water at 38°50.682′N 074°43.078′W.

=== 4 August ===
List of shipwrecks: 4 August 2005
Ship	State	Description
Casitas	United States	MV Casitas aground on 4 August 2005. The National Oceanic and Atmospheric Administration-chartered 145-foot (44 m) research vessel was scuttled in over 7,000 feet (2,134 m) of water in the Pacific Ocean northwest of Pearl and Hermes Atoll in the Northwestern Hawaiian Islands. She had been badly damaged when she ran aground on the north side of Pearl and Hermes Atoll on 2 July 2005.
Porvenir I	Chile	The roll on, roll off cargo ship ran aground 460 nautical miles (850 km) south of Santiago. She broke up and sank with the loss of three of her fifteen crew.

=== 9 August ===
List of shipwrecks: 9 August 2005
Ship	State	Description
Seehund 1	Germany	The 18.25-metre (59 ft 11 in) pleasure vessel, a former passenger vessel, sprung a leak and sank in the North Sea off Eiderstedt, Germany (54°02′N 08°34′E). The wreck was raised and scrapped.

=== 10 August ===
List of shipwrecks: 10 August 2005
Ship	State	Description
Pair of Kings	United States	The retired 132-foot (40.2 m) barge was scuttled as an artificial reef in the North Atlantic Ocean off Wildwood, New Jersey, at 38°58.030′N 074°41.050′W.

=== 22 August ===
List of shipwrecks: 22 August 2005
Ship	State	Description
USS Oldendorf	United States Navy	The decommissioned Spruance-class destroyer was sunk as a target in the Pacific Ocean off Hawaii by the guided-missile destroyer USS Russell (United States Navy).

=== 25 August ===
List of shipwrecks: 25 August 2005
Ship	State	Description
USS Briscoe	United States Navy	The decommissioned Spruance-class destroyer was sunk as a target in the Atlantic Ocean at 34°49′N 072°31′W.
USS Deyo	United States Navy	The decommissioned Spruance-class destroyer was sunk as a target.

=== 26 August ===
List of shipwrecks: 26 August 2005
Ship	State	Description
Alliance	United States	After her captain fell asleep at her wheel, the 93-foot (28.3 m) fish tender struck cliffs at Cape Resurrection (59°51′35″N 149°16′45″W) on the north side of Barwell Island (59.8600°N 149.2775°W) on the south-central coast of Alaska and sank in 300 feet (91 m) of water. All six people aboard – four adults and two children – were rescued by the vessel Black Velvet (United States).

=== Unknown date ===
List of shipwrecks: Unknown date August 2005
Ship	State	Description
Cory B	United States	The 32-foot (9.8 m) gillnet fishing vessel disappeared sometime around 28 August. She presumably sank in a storm in Bristol Bay near Coffee Point (58°12′20″N 157°26′15″W) on the coast of Alaska. Searchers sighted debris floating 2–4 nautical miles (3.7–7.4 km; 2.3–4.6 mi) off Coffee Point, but the body of the only person board, her captain, was never found.

== September ==
=== 2 September ===
List of shipwrecks: 2 September 2005
Ship	State	Description
Jet Trader	United States	The retired 156-foot (47.5 m) fuel oil barge was scuttled as an artificial reef in the North Atlantic Ocean east of Ocean City, New Jersey, at 39°13.850′N 074°12.510′W.

=== 6 September ===
List of shipwrecks: 6 September 2005
Ship	State	Description
ROCS Yun Yang	Republic of China Navy	The decommissioned Gearing-class guided-missile destroyer was sunk as a target off Ping Tung, Taiwan, by the submarine Hai Hu (Republic of China Navy).

=== 12 September ===
List of shipwrecks: 12 September 2005
Ship	State	Description
Shamrock	United States	The retired 48-foot (14.6 m) barge was scuttled as an artificial reef in the North Atlantic Ocean 4.5 nautical miles (8.3 km; 5.2 mi) off Ocean City, New Jersey, at 39°09.935′N 074°33.940′W.

== October ==
=== 10 October ===
List of shipwrecks: 10 October 2005
Ship	State	Description
Samho Brother	South Korea	The chemical tanker collided with TS Hongkong (Panama), capsized and sank 9 nautical miles (17 km) north west of Hsinchu, Taiwan. She was on a voyage from Pusan, South Korea to Taichung, Taiwan.

=== 14 October ===
List of shipwrecks: 14 October 2005
Ship	State	Description
MRS	United States	The 48-foot (14.6 m) shrimp-fishing vessel capsized in Clarence Strait near Grindall Island in Southeast Alaska with the loss of one life. There were two survivors.

== November ==
=== 12 November ===
List of shipwrecks: 12 November 2005
Ship	State	Description
Hustler	United States	The 56-foot (17.1 m) landing craft sank near Afognak Island in Alaska′s Kodiak Archipelago 3 nautical miles (5.6 km; 3.5 mi) south of Izhut Bay (58°11′N 152°15′W). Her crew of two clung to wreckage until rescued by a United States Coast Guard helicopter.

=== 13 November ===
List of shipwrecks: 13 November 2005
Ship	State	Description
HMNZS Wellington	Royal New Zealand Navy	Explosive charges detonating to sink Wellington. The decommissioned Perth-class frigate was sunk for use as a dive wreck in Houghton Bay off the coast of New Zealand.

=== Unknown date ===
List of shipwrecks: Unknown date November 2005
Ship	State	Description
Bay Jack	United States	The retired 56-foot (17.1 m) tug was scuttled as an artificial reef in the North Atlantic Ocean off Townsends Inlet, New Jersey, in 60 feet (18.3 m) of water at 39°06.450′N 074°36.020′W.

== December ==
=== 5 December ===
List of shipwrecks: 5 December 2005
Ship	State	Description
Maritime Lady	Gibraltar	The 80.73-metre (264 ft 10 in) cargo ship was damaged in a collision with Arctic Ocean (United Kingdom) in the Elbe River near the west end of the Kiel Canal. She capsized and drifted aground with only her bow above water at buoy 58A. The crew was rescued by the pilot boats Kapitan Kircheiss and Osteriff (both Germany). The wreck was raised and declared a constructive total loss.

=== 9 December ===
List of shipwrecks: 9 December 2005
Ship	State	Description
CP Valour	Bermuda	The container ship ran aground at Praia do Norte on Faial Island of the Azores. There were no injuries or casualties but the vessel could not be refloated and had to be scrapped on site. The empty hull was refloated in September 2006 and towed to the open sea but sank in heavy seas 10.8 nautical miles (12.4 mi; 20.0 km) north of Faial.

=== 13 December ===
List of shipwrecks: 13 December 2005
Ship	State	Description
Carthaginian II	Germany	The retired German whaler was scuttled to create an artificial reef off Lahaina near Puamana Beach Park in Hawaii, United States.

=== 20 December ===
List of shipwrecks: 20 December 2005
Ship	State	Description
Jill Adventure	United States	The retired 82-foot (25.0 m) fishing trawler was scuttled as an artificial reef in the North Atlantic Ocean off Townsends Inlet, New Jersey, in 60 feet (18 m) of water at 39°06.360′N 074°36.300′W.

== Unknown date ==
List of shipwrecks: Unknown date 2005
Ship	State	Description
"Boston Beverly"	Chilean Navy	The 150-foot (46 m) former fishing vessel was reportedly lost at Punta Arenas in the Magellan Straits sometime in 2005.
Carthaginian II	United States	The museum ship – a steel-hulled sailing ship – was sunk as an artificial reef 0.5 nautical miles (0.58 mi; 0.93 km) off Lahaina, Maui, Hawaii.
Dolce Vita	United States	The fishing vessel was destroyed in the waters of Alaska by a fire that started when a coffeemaker short-circuited. The only person aboard survived.
