= Mala Wharf =

Pier in Maui, Hawaii

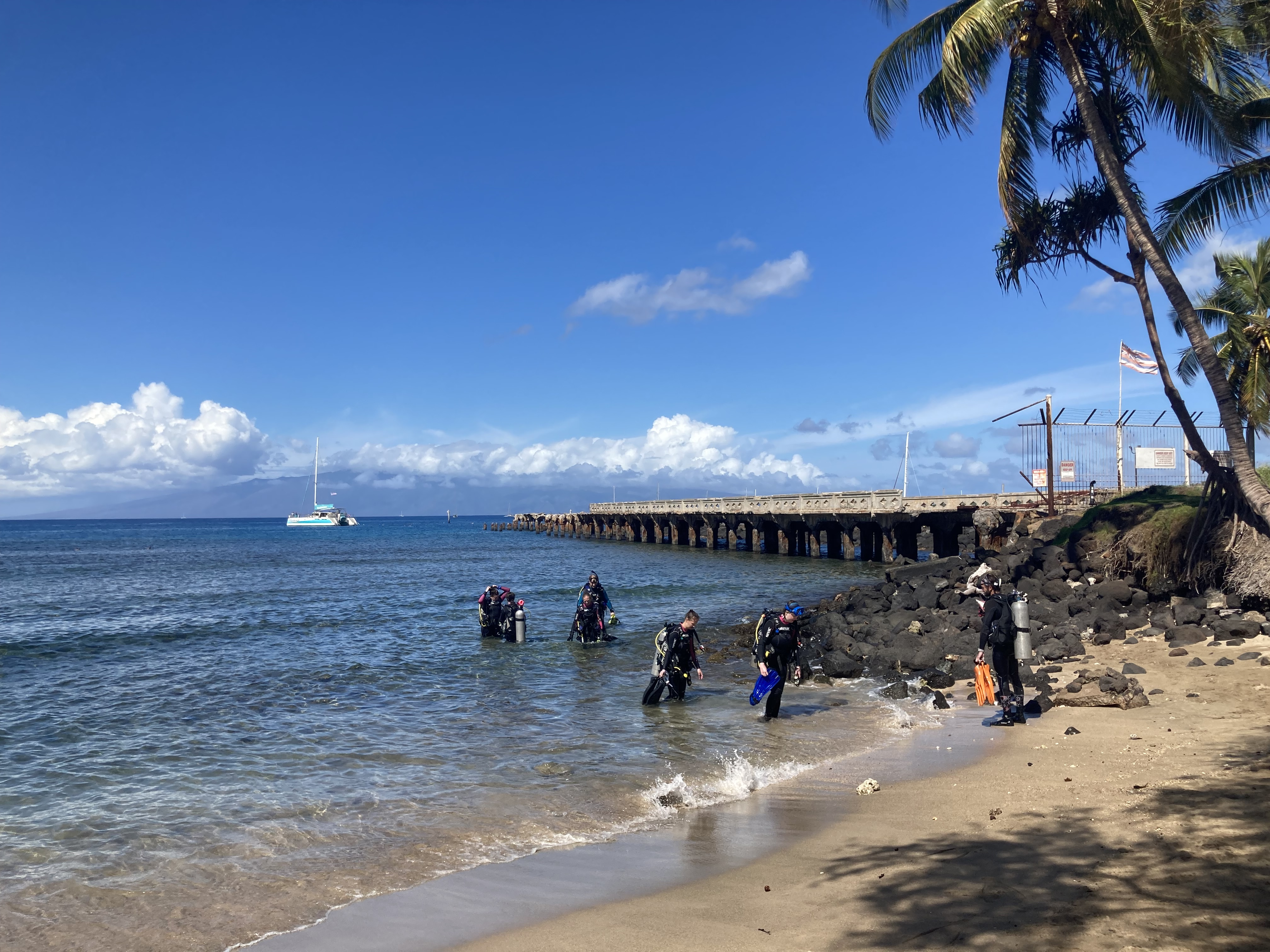
- The pier in 2025
- Spans: Pacific Ocean
- Location: Lahaina, Hawaii
- Coordinates: 20.8852°N 156.6870°W
- Maintained by: Hawaii Department of Land and Natural Resources Division of Boating & Ocean Recreation

History
- Designer: United States Army Corps of Engineers
- Constructor: United States Army Corps of Engineers
- Opening date: 1922

Mala Wharf is a historic pier in Lahaina, Hawaii, on the island of Maui. Opened in 1922, strong currents led to it being neglected and eventually falling into disrepair, with the damage being aggravated by Hurricane Iniki in 1992. Much of the debris that has fallen onto the seafloor has accumulated and become a coral reef, leading to it becoming a popular location for snorkeling.

== History ==
Mala Wharf was built in 1922 as a landing dock for ships transporting sugar from the Pioneer plantation and pineapples from the Baldwin Packers pineapple cannery in the town. The United States Army Corps of Engineers constructed the pier out of steel-reinforced concrete on the site of an ancient Hawaiian fishpond called 'Alamihi. It cost $200,000. The pond had been the site of a battle between Kauhi'aimokuakama, the high chief of Maui, and Kamehameha I. Kauhi'aimokuakama was rebelling against the reign of Kamahameha, and the engagement took place a short time before Western contact with the Hawaiian Islands in 1778. The pond was originally bisected by the road approaching the wharf, but it was later was filled entirely in 1930; this area eventually became a parking lot.

Many locals recommended against building a pier at the site due to the ocean activity and currents. It was later found that the currents were too powerful for a large ship to dock. Following this discovery, the wharf was repurposed for smaller vessels transporting passengers between islands. Many ships also anchored in the bay to transfer their passengers and cargo to smaller boats that traveled onto a landing on the wharf. A story in The Maui News described the first boat to tie up at the wharf as the inter-island steamer Onomea on February 22, 1922. The United States Navy's sailing fleet, including the USS Arizona, would frequently dock off Mala Wharf in the early 1900s. The pier was also used for whaling activities.

During World War II, many soldiers used the wharf to board boats to leave the island. The state closed the wharf c. 1959; they had previously been keeping up repairs until 1941, when they ran out of funds to keep it in service. With the closure of the wharf came the end of the inter-island ferry service, which was replaced by light aircraft. By the 1970s, the wharf was a popular site for fishing and recreation. Hurricane Iniki struck Maui on September 11, 1992, causing further damage to the pier. Much of the structure farthest from land, including the deck, collapsed.

Due to the popularity of the wharf with tourists, it has become overcrowded and there is little space for locals to fish or canoe. Due to this, locals sued the Hawaii Department of Land and Natural Resources (DLNR) in 2022, saying that the government has not properly controlled the amount of businesses on or near the wharf. There are sixteen companies that have permits for tourist activities, but they allege that many other unregistered ones host activities near the pier. The lawsuit failed, but Hawaii senator Angus McKelvey said that he had secured almost $4 million to repave the parking lot and repair other aspects of the wharf.

== Ecology ==
Hurricane Iniki in 1992 caused many of the supports to collapse and fall into the ocean. Some of the large concrete pilings broke and piled on top of each other on the seafloor. Eventually, an artificial coral reef formed, filled with many overhangs and caves. It is important for marine biology research because the date on which the reef first developed is known, due to the hurricane. In addition, it is the only large reef structure in the area, meaning that many animals exclusively hide in this location. The 2023 Hawaii wildfires in Lahaina set up possible damage for the coral reef in the future, as many buildings that burned down were made using asbestos and metal, which can contaminate the water and cause coral disease outbreaks if they reach the water and the coral reef. Debris and ash can also coat the corals and hinder their photosynthesis.

Animals in or around the coral reef include whitetip reef sharks, butterflyfish, bluefin trevally, pufferfish, chubs, goatfish, Hawaiian squirrelfish, nudibranchs, orange cup coral, snowflake coral, and black coral.
