= Carthaginian (ship) =

Movie prop and museum ship in Hawaii

Coordinates: 20.8712°N 156.6786°W

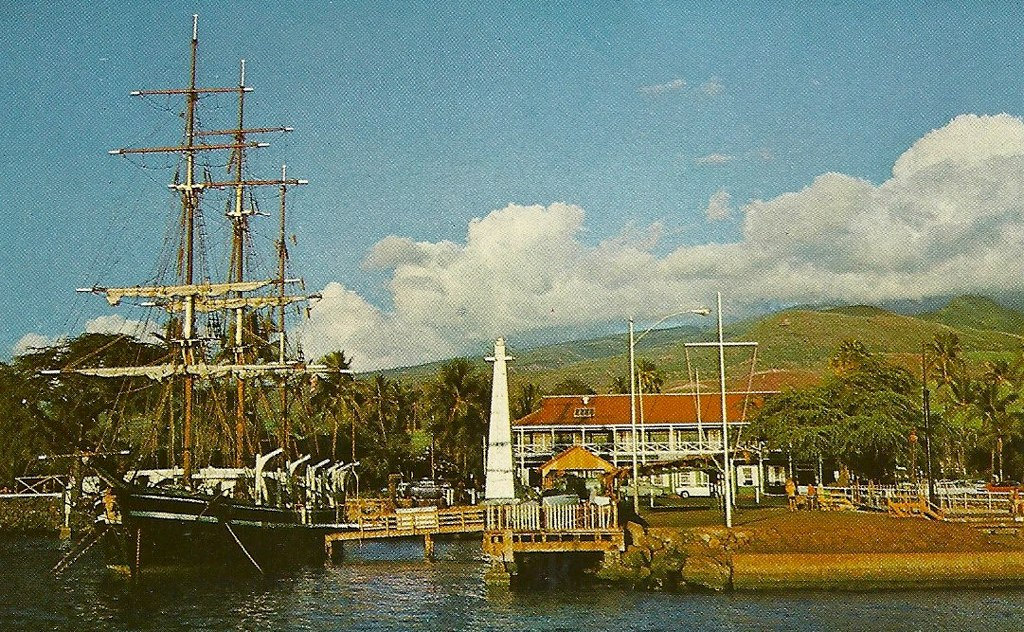
- The Carthaginian served as a museum (from a postcard of Lahaina Harbor, sometime before 1972).

History
- Name: launched as Wandia
- Completed: 1921
- Out of service: 1964
- Fate: Sold to Tucker Thompson, converted to square-rig whaleship and acquired by Lahaina Restoration Foundation c.1966–67

History
- Name: Carthaginian
- Owner: Lahaina Restoration Foundation
- Acquired: 1966
- Fate: Ran aground and sank, April 2, 1972; scrapped in situ

General characteristics
- Type: Three-masted barque outfitted as a whaler
- Length: 130 feet (40 m)
- Beam: 22.5 feet (6.9 m)
- Height: 90 feet (27 m) above waterline to top of mainmast
- Draft: 9 feet (2.7 m)
- Propulsion: 185 horsepower (138 kW) diesel for maneuvering in port
- Sail plan: 17 sails, 10,000 square feet (930 m^{2})

Carthaginian was a three-masted barque outfitted as a whaler that served both as a movie prop and a museum ship in Hawaii. Laid down and launched in Denmark in 1921 as the three-masted schooner Wandia, she was converted in 1964–1965 into a typical square-rigged 19th-century whaler for the filming of the 1966 movie Hawaii. Afterward, she was moored in the harbor of the former whaling port-of-call of Lahaina on the Hawaiian island of Maui, explaining the whaling industry in the Hawaiian islands. Carthaginian was lost in 1972 when she ran aground just outside the harbor on her way to drydock maintenance on Oahu and was replaced as a whaling museum by Carthaginian II in 1980.

== History ==
The vessel that last sailed, and gained fame, as Carthaginian was built in 1921 in Denmark as the three-masted schooner Wandia. She hauled cargo in the Baltic Sea for owner Captain Petersen for 30 years. After a few more fishing commercially out of Iceland, she was purchased and taken to Central America as a general cargo ship. Unsuccessful there, she was scheduled to take part in the inaugural Operation Sail procession in New York Harbor in July 1964, sailing under a Panamanian flag. Instead, she was purchased by R. Tucker Thompson in November 1964 after an inspection in Acapulco.

She was delivered to San Diego later that year. After advertising her availability, Thompson sold the ship to the Mirisch Company, a Hollywood production company, which was filming Hawaii. Thompson held an option to be the first to repurchase the ship after filming was completed. Under Mirisch it was outfitted in the Southern California port of San Pedro as a barque, square-rigged on its main and fore masts and fore and aft rigged on its mizzen, to resemble a 19th-century whaler for scenes in the 1966 film Hawaii. The cost of the refit was US$150,000, performed under the supervision of vintage sailing ship experts Alan Villiers, (Note: Villiers was better known for sailing Mayflower II across the Atlantic in 1957.) Ken Reynard, (Note: At the time, Reynard was captain of the San Diego museum ship Star of India.) Karl Kortum, (Note: Kortum was director of the San Francisco Maritime Museum.) and Bill Bartz, (Note: Bartz was captain of the San Francisco Maritime Museum's ship Balclutha.) who then sailed the ship to Hawaii with Villiers as captain and Reynard as mate. Upon its arrival, it was renamed Carthaginian for the ship of that name in the 1959 novel Hawaii by James A. Michener, on which the 1966 film was based.

After filming was complete in November 1965 Thompson re-purchased Carthaginian and set off for California, calling at Lahaina along the way. Following this, Larry Windley, director of the non-profit "Lahaina Restoration Foundation" (LRF), convinced its members to make an offer to purchase the ship as a tourist attraction harking back to Lahaina's time as a whaling port. When the ship next made land in Hilo on the Big Island of Hawaii, LRF representatives met her and approached Thompson. He agreed to a postponed consummation of the deal, continuing on first to California, where stops included Sausalito, before embarking on a five month sail to Tahiti.

After advertising for 20 working crew (who would each pay US$1500 for the privilege), the ship sailed from San Diego on August 4, 1966, and returned to Lahaina in January 1967. There it was converted into a whaling ship museum and tourist attraction, with Thompson serving as captain and curator. Thompson left in 1968, and LRF declared it would be maintained as a working vessel, making an annual trip to dry dock on Oahu under a volunteer crew.

Carthaginian was featured in several scenes of the sequel to Hawaii, The Hawaiians (1970), captained by Whip Hoxworth, played by Charlton Heston.

Carthaginian ran aground on the Lahaina Reef on April 2, 1972, while sailing to dry dock at Oahu. The wreck was stripped in place of its masts, rigging, exhibits, and figurehead, then pieced and barged to a dump in Olowalu.

Another ex-Baltic Sea cargo schooner was acquired to replace it in 1973, later renamed Carthaginian II.
