= John Howard Kyan =

English inventor

John Howard Kyan (27 November 1774 – 5 January 1850) was the inventor of the 'kyanising' process for preserving wood.

== Early life ==
Kyan was the son of John Howard Kyan of Mount Howard and Ballymurtagh, County Wexford, and was born in Dublin on 27 November 1774. His father owned valuable copper mines in Wicklow (now worked by the Wicklow Copper Mines Company) and, for some time worked them himself. The son was educated to take part in the management of the mines, but soon after he entered the company its fortunes declined, and in 1804 his father died almost penniless.

== History of kyanising ==
=== Development ===
For a time Kyan was employed at some vinegar works at Newcastle upon Tyne, but subsequently removed to London, to Greaves's vinegar brewery in Old Street Road. The decay of the timber supports in his father's copper mines had already directed his attention to the question of preserving wood, and as early as 1812 he began experiments with a view to discovering a method of preventing the decay. Eventually he found that bichloride of mercury or corrosive sublimate, as it was commonly called, gave the best results and, without revealing the nature of the process, he submitted a block of oak impregnated with that substance to the Admiralty in 1828. It was placed in the 'fungus pit' at Woolwich, where it remained for three years exposed to all the conditions favourable to decay. When taken out in 1831, it was found to be perfectly sound, and after further trials it still remained unaffected.

=== Patents ===
Kyan patented his discovery in 1832 (Nos. 8263 and 6309), extending the application of the invention to the preservation of paper, canvas, cloth, cordage, etc. A further patent was granted in 1836 (No. 7001).

The preservative action of a solution of bichloride of mercury was previously well known, and Kyan's process merely consisted of the submersion of timber or other materials in a tank containing a solution of corrosive sublimate in water. It was maintained by the inventor that permanent chemical combination took place between the mercurial salt and the woody fibre, but this was contested.

=== Publicity ===
The process attracted great attention. Faraday chose it as the subject of his inaugural lecture at the Royal Institution on 22 February 1833, on his appointment as Fullerian professor of chemistry. Dr. Birkbeck gave a lecture upon it at the Society of Arts on 9 December 1834, and in 1835 the Admiralty published the report of a committee appointed by the board to inquire into the value of the new method. In 1836, Kyan sold his rights to the Anti-Dry Rot Company, an Act of Parliament being passed which authorised the raising of a capital of £250,000. Tanks were constructed at Grosvenor Basin, Pimlico, at the Grand Surrey Canal Dock, Rotherhide, and at the City Road Basin. Great things were predicted of 'kyanising,' as the process then began to be called. A witty writer in 'Bently's Miscellany' for January 1837 told how the muses had adopted Kyan's improvement to preserve their favourite trees. At a dinner given to celebrate the success which attended the experiment, a song, which became popular, was first sung. The opening verse runs:

Have you heard, have you heard
Anti-dry Rot's the word?
Wood will never wear out, thanks to Kyan, to Kyan!
He dips in a tank any rafter or plank,
And makes it immortal as Dian, as Dian!

=== Applications ===
Among the early applications of the process was the kyanising of the palings round the Inner Circle, Regent's Park, which was carried out in 1835 as an advertisement, small brass plates being attached to the palings at intervals stating that the wood had been subjected to the new process. The plates soon disappeared, but the original palings still remain in good condition.

The timber used in building the Oxford and Cambridge Club, British Museum, Royal College of Surgeons, Westminster Bridewell, the new roof of the Temple Church, and the Ramsgate harbour works was also prepared by Kyan's process. When wooden railway sleepers ("ties" in the USA) became general (in place of the stone blocks used on the early lines), a very profitable business for Kyan's company was anticipated, and for a time these hopes were realised.

The process was also applied to ships' timbers and sails. The whaler John Palmer received some treated wood as she underwent repairs in 1833 and on her return to England from the Pacific in 1837 her master, Captain Elisha Clark, wrote a testimonial for the process.

=== Decline ===
It became evident that iron fastenings could not be used in wood treated with corrosive sublimate, on account of the corrosive action, and it was said that the wood became brittle. The salt was somewhat expensive and Sir William Burnett's method of preserving timber by chloride of zinc, and afterwards the application of creosote for that purpose, proved severe competitors. Doubts began to be expressed as to the real efficiency of kyanising (see Proceedings of the Institution of Civil Engineers, 11 January 1853, pp. 206–243), and the process gradually ceased to be employed.

== Other inventions and interests ==
Besides the invention with which his name is associated, Kyan took out patents in 1833 (No. 6534) for propelling ships by a jet of water ejected at the stern, and in 1837 (No. 7460) for a method of obtaining ammoniacal salts from gas liquor. He was a member of the London Electrical Society and also the author of 'The Elements of Light and their Identity with those of Matter radiant or fixed,' 1838. He died on 5 January 1850 at New York City, where he was engaged on a plan for filtering the water supplied to that city by the Croton aqueduct.

== Arms ==
Coat of arms of John Howard Kyan

Notes
Granted 29 September 1855 by Sir John Bernard Burke, Ulster King of Arms.
Crest
A wild cat rampant Proper gorged with an anqitue dish blown Or.
Escutcheon
Gules an antique dish blown Or between three fishes haurient two and one Argent.

== See also ==
- Wood preservation
