= Lahaina Fort =

Historic fort in Lahaina in Maui, Hawaii

- Lahaina, Maui, Hawaii
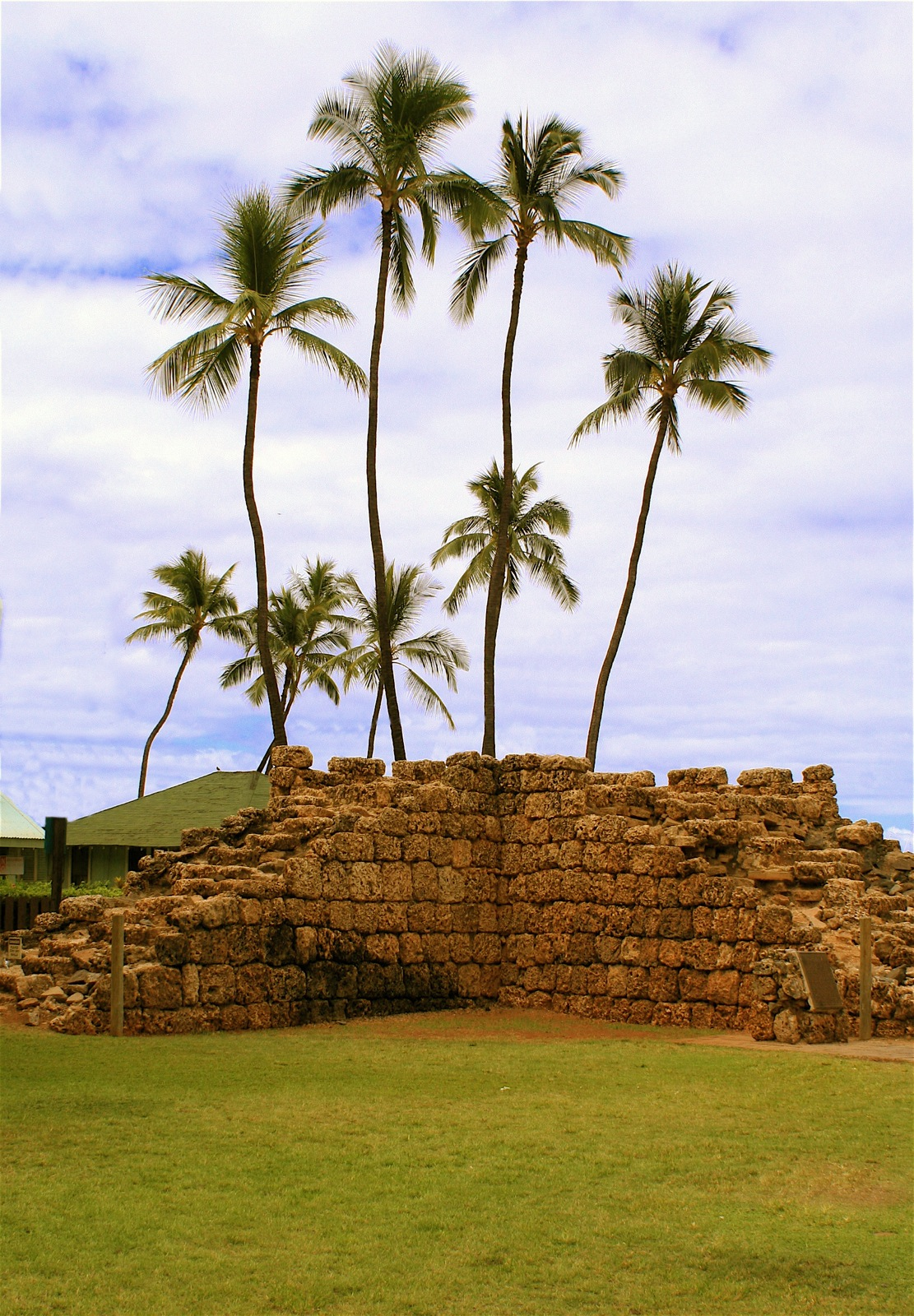
- Reconstructed part of the fort at the southern corner of the Lohiana Banayan Tree park

Site information
- Type: Originally for defense

Site history
- Built: 1834-
- In use: Demolished in 1854
- Materials: Coral stones
- Battles/wars: Attack of Whalerships

The Lahaina Fort, a historic fort, facing the Lahaina Harbor, was located in Lahaina in Maui, Hawaii, of which the reconstructed part is now seen at the southern corner of the Lahaina Banyan Court Park. Christian Missionaries enforced law to prevent whalers and sailors from creating moral degradation in the town by drinking and debauchery. The embittered whalers and sailors caused rioting several times and tried to harm the missionaries. Following these incidents, the fort was then built at the initiative of Queen Kaʻahumanu (1768–1832) the then regent of Kuhina Nui to quell disturbances to the people of Lahaina from the ship whalers. Ulumāheihei Hoapili (1775–1840), the Governor of Maui got it built in a month. Lahaina Fort was demolished in 1854. However, in 1964, the State Parks Department reconstructed a part of old fort wall in the southwest corner of the park which was the venue for the 1961 feature film, The Devil at 4 O'Clock.

== Location ==
The fort is located in Lahaina, a port town on the west coast of Maui island. Lahaina was then the capital of Hawaii and residence of the royalty. Kahului Airport is the nearest airport, which is 27 miles (43 km) away by road.

== History ==
With the arrival of American whaling ships in Lahaina from 1819 and Kamehameha II reading in the town, the first missionaries also arrived in the town in 1820; Rev. C. S. Stewart and the Rev. William Richards came in 1823, and they were invited by Queen Mother Keopuolani.

In the period between 1830 and 1860, American whaling fleets frequented the Lahaina port town which resulted in growth of the economy of the island and brought about modernization. Enjoined with this development was the morality problems created by the visitors [whalers and sailors] because of their addiction to liquor and women. This became the cause for the clashes between the Christian missionaries who enforced what is termed as "blue laws". This caused the "boisterous" sea men to clash with the missionaries.

With increasing conversions to Christianity the missionaries prevailed on Hoapili, the Governor of Maui, to promulgate laws to prohibit sale of liquor and banning native woman from soliciting by visiting the ships (women used to swim across to ships to meet the sailors) Initial measures taken by the Christian missionaries of the town by enforcing laws (a kapu, the ancient Hawaiian code of conduct of laws and regulations of Hawaii proclaimed in 1825) to prevent the native women visiting the ships or and to prevent the whaling community and sailors from visiting the town after nightfall, in pursuit of pleasure, embittered the sailors and whalers.

The "sea-bittered sailors" were not pleased with these stringent regulations, and in 1825 the English whaler Daniel caused rioting in the town for three days and even gave out life threats to Reverend William Richards. Rioting occurred many times, and in one instance in 1827 cannonballs were reported to have been lobbed by the English whaler John Palmer. at the lawn of the Missionary house of William Richard. To prevent such incidents from recurring, Hoapili (1775–1840), the Governor of Maui, built a new fort replacing the original fort that was made of mud and sand.

Queen Kaʻahumanu (1768–1832), the regent of Kuhina Nui, who was a supporter of Rev. Richards, authorized Hoapili, the Governor of Maui to protect the town by building a fort. Hoapili then got the fort built within a month. The sea men who did not conform to the evening curfew were imprisoned in the fort. A visitor noted: "must be off to their ships, or into the fort", who also noted the condition of the sailors in the prison as: "caressed and hung upon by native girls, who flock here in the ship season, from other parts, to get the ready wages of sin."

In 1841, American naval officer Charles Wilkes (1798–1877) who visited Lahaina Fort as commanding officer of the United States Exploring Expedition observed: "After the king's palace, the fort is the most conspicuous object: it is of little account, however, as a defence, serving chiefly to confine unruly subjects and sailors in. The area within is about one acre, and the walls are twenty feet high."

There was an ad in the Polynesian Newspaper announcing: "For Sale: A Quantity of Old Guns formerly mounted on the fort at Lahaina – can be seen at the fort in this city."

== Features ==
The fort was built in 1832 in a "quadrangular" shape covering an area of 1 acre. It was built with coral stones drawn from the coastal reef within 40 yards offshore into the sea. It was raised to a height of 20 feet (6.1 m). Defense reinforcements were provided on the top of the fort in the form of cannons; the canons were 47 numbers of different sizes, which had been recovered from the shipwrecks in various regions of Hawaii. The fort's location facilitated policing of the whale ships that were anchored at the harbour in large numbers.

In 1848, Henery Wise who visited Lahaina Fort, where the then governor was residing, noted:

"[It is] a large square enclosure constructed of red coral rocks, banked up fifteen feet with earth, and mounting an oddly resorted battery of some thirty pieces of artillery, of all sorts of cartridges, and claibre long, short, and medium; they commanded the usual anchorage and no doubt very well to prevent any acts of violence from merchant ships; but it is a question, if, at the second discharging of shot, they do not tremble to pieces. There were a company of Hawaiian troops to man this fortress, who were well uniformed, and looked as well as Kanakas, or any other savages who have been accustomed half their lives to go naked can look when their natural ease of motion is cramped by European clothing".

.

With the decline of the whaling industry and the California Gold Rush, in the late 1840s, Hawaii's population dropped, and infectious disease epidemics contributed to the loss of local populations.

The restoration works carried out on the fort in 1847 involved addition of a powder magazine, removal of dilapidated parts of the bastions and building an additional wooden building for housing the office of the governor. The governor's residence on the ramparts of the fort was also renovated. A prison was also built within the fort, which consisted of four rooms. The refurbished fort was now used more as a prison than for defending the Kingdom. The cannons were rusting and the fort was mostly empty of personnel except for a few soldiers and the Governor of Maui who lived there.

The fort, which was used as a prison, was demolished in 1854. The coral stones recovered from this demolition were reused elsewhere, and in building the new prison, Hale Paahao. However, in 1964, the State Parks Department reconstructed a part of old fort wall in the southwest corner of the park, and it is featured in the 1961 feature film, The Devil at 4 O'Clock .

The canons were seldom used for the intended purpose. However, they were used to provide gun salute every year on the occasion of the birthday of Kamehameha III. Another notable daily event at the fort was the beating of the drums at dusk by guards as a signal (a curfew) to the sailors on land to go back to their ships. This practice is recorded in detail by Jones as:

"Seamen are obliged to be clear of the beach at drumbeat—eight o'clock in the evening. No person is allowed to remain on shore over night, unless furnished with a proper pass by the captain of the port; and any one found on the beach, or in the town, with no pass, after the proper time, is marched to the calboose, where he is kept in confinement till morning, and then muleted in a pretty round sum for breaking the laws. This is generally paid by the captain, and afterward, with pretty good interest, deducted from Jack's pay."

== Bibliography ==
- Ford, Alexander Hume (1915). The Mid-Pacific Magazine. T.H. [A.H. Ford&#93.
- Foster, Jeanette (July 17, 2012). Frommer's Maui 2013. John Wiley & Sons. ISBN 978-1-118-33145-3.
- Mills, Peter R. (January 1, 2002). Hawai_i's Russian Adventure: A New Look at Old History. University of Hawaii Press. ISBN 978-0-8248-2404-4.
- Sharp, Barbara E. (August 28, 2007). The Wind Mists. ISBN 978-0-9714277-3-0.
- Theunissen, Amanda; Cabasin, Linda (August 28, 2007). Maui 2008. Fodor's Travel Publications. ISBN 978-1-4000-1791-1.
- Ward, Greg (January 20, 2011). The Rough Guide to Hawaii. Rough Guides. ISBN 978-1-4053-8581-7.
- Whitton, Kevin (August 19, 2014). Moon Hawaiian Islands. Avalon Travel Publishing. ISBN 978-1-61238-832-8.
