= John Palmer (1807 ship) =

British ship (1807–1841)

History

United Kingdom
- Name: John Palmer
- Owner: 1818:Marsh; 1823:Benjamin Rotch
- Launched: 1807, Plymouth
- Fate: Broken up 1841.

General characteristics
- Tons burthen: 393, or 399 (bm)
- Propulsion: Sail
- Armament: 9-pounder guns

John Palmer was built at Plymouth in 1807, possibly under another name. There is a missing decade (1807–1817) during which she is absent from Lloyd's Register and the Register of Shipping. From 1818 on she is traceable as she traded with India and South America. In 1823 new owners purchased her and she became a whaler, making five voyages between 1823 and 1841, when she was "broken up".

== Merchantman ==
John Palmer first appeared in the registers in 1818 (there being no registers published in 1817), having undergone a "thorough repair" and having received copper sheathing over boards in 1817. Her master was Saunders, her owner Marsh & Co., and her trade London—India. She then sailed in 1819 to Bombay under a license from the British East India Company. She left Mauritius on 23 April 1821, bound for the Cape of Good Hope.

She left Port Louis, Mauritius, on 26 April 1822, and arrived at the Cape of Good hope on 29 May. On 18 May she had seen a sunken boat and debris near it. The suspicion was that the vessel was Brougham, which had sailed from Port Louis with a cargo of wheat two weeks before John Palmer.

After that voyage John Palmer started trading with South America.

== Whaler ==
Lloyd's Register for 1823 showed John Palmer's master changing from Saunders to Clark, and her trade from Liverpool—Brazils to London—South Seas. It also showed her as having undergone a "good repair" in 1823. Lloyd's Register for 1824 showed her owner as (Benjamin) Rotch and her master W. Clark.

=== Whaling voyage #1 (1823–1826) ===
Captain J. (or Elisha) Clark sailed from England on 3 September 1823, bound for the South Seas fishery. John Palmer left Madeira on 11 October. She was reported to be at the Sandwich Islands on 11 October 1824 with 900 barrels of oil. She was next reported to have left Honolulu on 15 November 1825. She returned to England on 4 July 1826 with 700 casks of sperm oil.

In 1826, Clark became the first European to sight Onotoa, in the Gilbert Islands.

=== Whaling voyage #2 (1826–1829) ===
Captain Clark sailed from England on 23 September 1826, bound for the South Seas. John Palmer was at Madeira on 9 October, and at Tahiti by 9 December. She was at the Sandwich Islands between 25 October 1828 and 22 November. leaving with 1200 barrels. She then was at Tahiti again in December. John Palmer returned to England on 10 April 1829 with 650 casks.

On 23 October 1827, John Palmer was at Lahaina, Hawaii. There local women came on board and bartered sexual favors for goods, in violation of the local government's prohibition of such activities. When Clark took a boat ashore, Maui Governor Hoapili, responding to concerns of Christian missionaries living there, seized Clark and the sailors manning the boat. Hoapili agreed to release the men on the understanding that Clark would land the women at Lahaina. Clark had left instructions with the mate to fire some shots if Clark had not returned in an hour. Before Clark returned to John Palmer the mate fired five 9-pounder shots towards the house of the missionary William Richards, some of which landed in the yard without doing serious damage. Richards and his wife took shelter in the basement. Clark and his men returned to John Palmer and then sailed off without landing the women.

Kahekili, a local warrior, commanded a small battery on the walls of a fort at Lahaina. He requested permission to return fire, which Hoapili refused. Hoapili then in 1831 built a more substantial fort, Old Lahaina Fort, to protect the town from riotous sailors.

=== Whaling voyage #3 (1829–1833) ===
Captain Clark sailed from England on 21 July 1829, bound for the South Seas fishery. In late 1831 she had 1000 barrels. In November she was off Japan with 1700 barrels. She was at Honolulu between 19 November and 2 December. She was at Mowee (Maui) on 24 April 1832. In April she had 1850 barrels, and then was again at Honolulu on 1 November 1832 with 2500 barrels, and then on 12 November at Maui. She was at Tahiti on 7 January 1833, and returned to England on 18 May with 610 casks.

=== Whaling voyage #4 (1833–1837) ===
One source reports that Captain Kemp sailed from England on 30 January 1834, bound for Timor. She was at Saint Helena on 16 February 1837 with 2400 barrels.

However, a more detailed report has John Palmer being repaired in the East Country Dock, London, in the autumn of 1833, and having her timbers and sails treated with "Kyan's Patent Process", a process for protecting wood from decay that John Howard Kyan had patented in 1828. She then sailed 13 December, not returning until 22 April 1837. Her master was R. Pattenden Lawrence. The occasion of the report was an investigation, and testimonial, for the efficacy of Kyan's wood treatment.

=== Whaling voyage #5 (1837–1841) ===
Captain R. Pattenden Lawrence sailed from England on 21 July 1837, bound for Timor and the seas off Japan. In February 1838 she was at Timor, and on 20 May at the Bonin Islands (Ogasawara Islands), where two of her men deserted. She was at Guam on 19 October 1839 and the Bonin Islands again on 10 May. On her second visit, one of the men who had deserted rejoined her. By 26 February 1840 she had 2300 barrels. She visited Copang to cooper 2100 barrels. John Palmer was at St Helena between 13 and 28 December with 2600 barrels. She returned to England on 13 February 1841

== Fate ==
On her return from her last voyage John Palmer was broken up. Her entry in Lloyd's Register for 1841 has the notation "Broken up".
