= Carthaginian II =

Steel sailing vessel sunk as artificial reef

Coordinates: 20°51′45.8″N 156°40′30.7″W

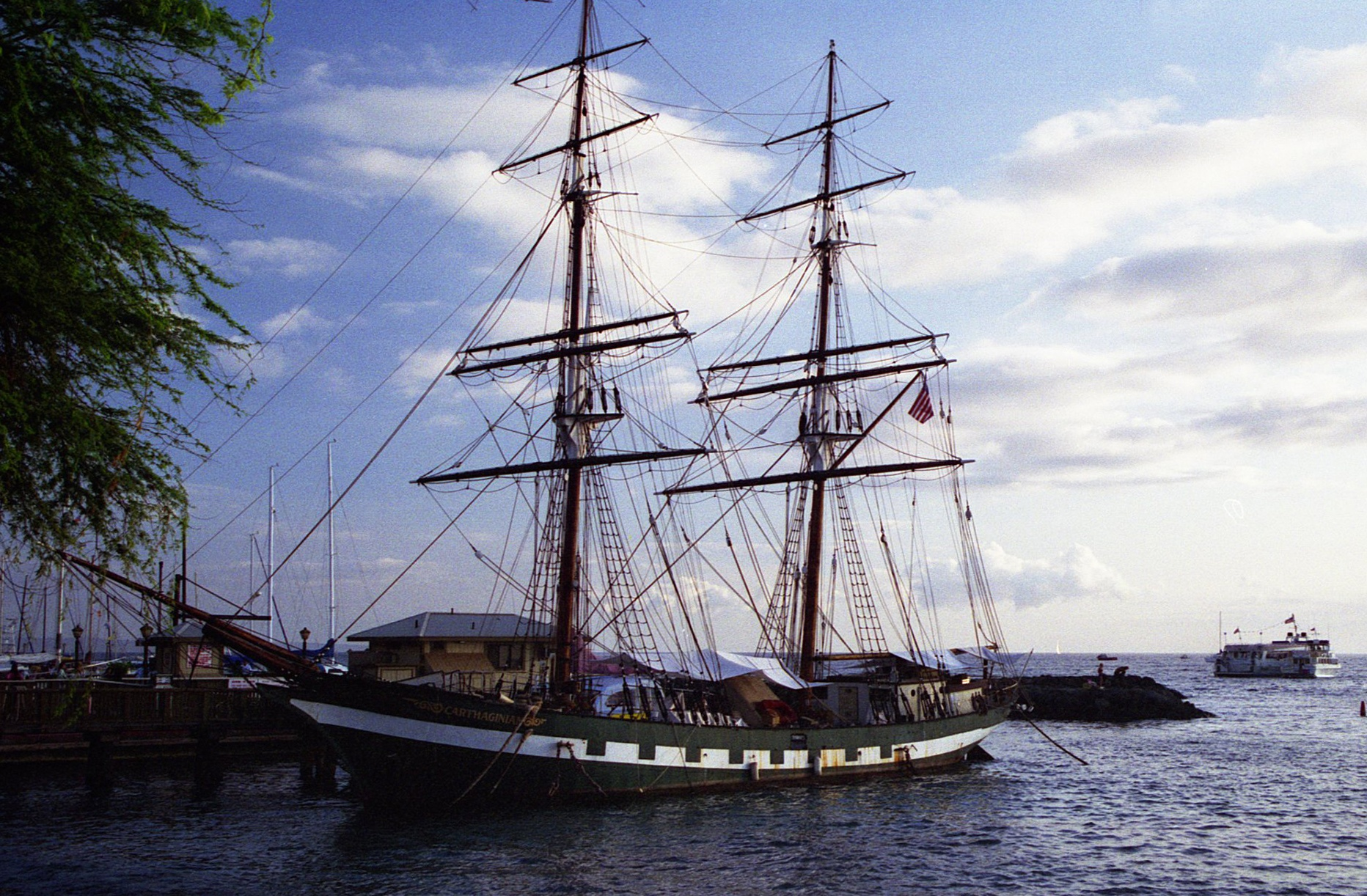
- Carthaginian II in 1997, while a museum in Lahaina Harbor

History
- Name: Mary, Familiens Haab, Komet
- Builder: Fr. Krupp Germania Shipyard, Kiel
- Yard number: 388
- Completed: 1920
- Out of service: 1970
- Fate: Sold to Lahaina Restoration Foundation, 1972

History
- Name: Carthaginian II
- Owner: Lahaina Restoration Foundation
- Acquired: 1972
- Identification: IMO number: 5192080
- Fate: Sunk, December 13, 2005

General characteristics
- Type: two-mast square-rigged whaler, auxiliary motor power
- Tonnage: 140 short tons (130 t) (gross)
- Length: 30 metres (98 ft)
- Beam: 6.7 metres (22 ft)
- Draft: 2.1 metres (6 ft 11 in)

Carthaginian II was a steel-hulled brig outfitted as a whaler, which served as a symbol of that industry in the harbor of the former whaling town Lahaina on the Hawaiian island of Maui. She replaced the original Carthaginian, a schooner converted into a barque to resemble a period whaler, which had initiated the role of museum ship there in 1967.

Carthaginian II was built in Germany as a schooner in 1920 and christened as Mary. She was brought to Maui in 1973, re-rigged, and served as a whaling museum until 2005, and after being sunk to create an artificial reef, now serves as a diving destination.

== History ==
The vessel was built in 1920 in Kiel, Germany, as a two-masted schooner at the Friedrich Krupp Germaniawerft shipyard. Christened as Mary, she was just under 30 metres (98 ft) long, with a nominal displacement of 125 short tons (113 t) (gross).

Mary was one of a group of forty ships completed at Kiel intended to operate primarily under motor power, with auxiliary sail. Terms imposed in the wake of the World War I Armistice required Germany to hand over all new ships built as large steam or motor vessels.

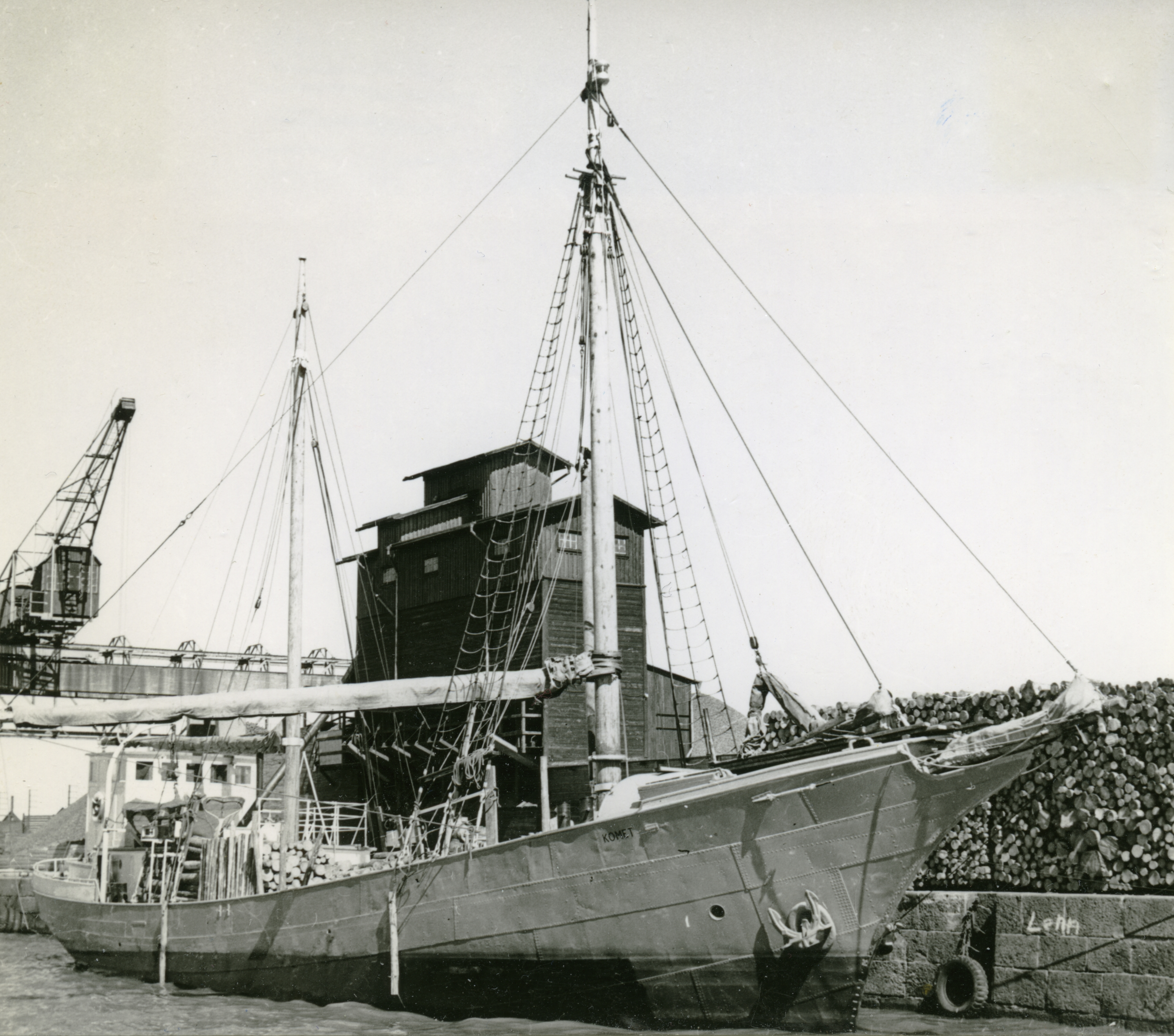
As Komet in Sweden

As a result, Mary was sold shortly after completion to Denmark, and renamed Familiens Haab in 1922. In 1923 she was sold to Sweden and renamed Komet. She worked the Baltic Sea as a freighter hauling cement until 1970 and was decommissioned. Because Krupp had built her hull using steel that had been intended for U-boats, Komet (and her sisters) developed a reputation for longevity.

Komet was purchased in 1973 by the non-profit "Lahaina Restoration Foundation" (LRF). for approximately $21,000 and motored from Søby, Denmark to Hawaii by an all-Lahaina crew. The 105 day passage, via Madeira and the Panama Canal, arrived on September 7, 1973. After installing 15 short tons (14 t) of cement and steel ballast to counterbalance a heavy square rig being assembled onshore to replace its original streamlined schooner sail plan, it was renamed Carthaginian II and restored over several years. Masts made of spruce, a deck of eucalyptus, and other details for a whaling supply ship of the 19th century were installed. In 1980, the ship was opened as a floating whaling museum.

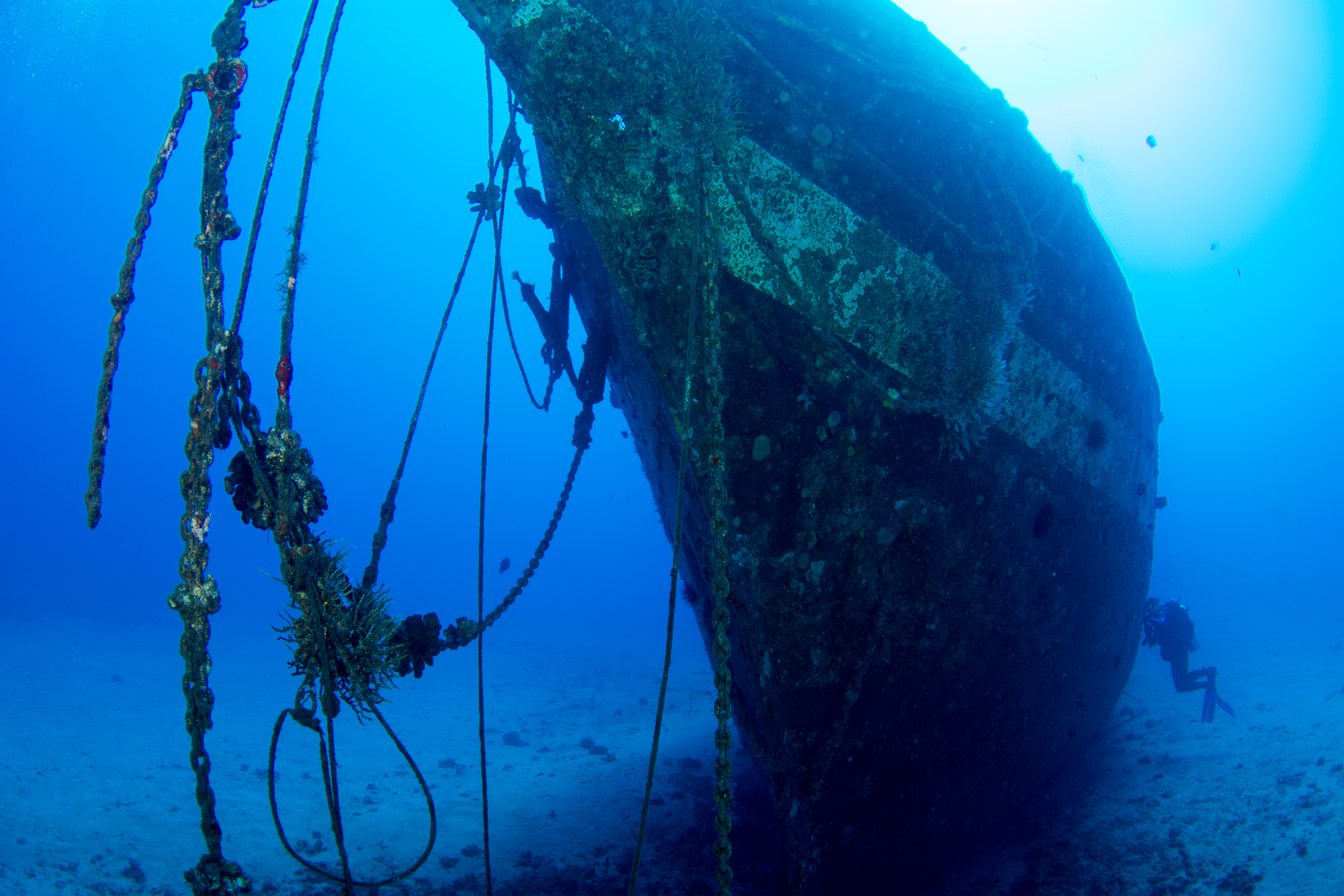
Underwater in 2017

The addition of internal ballast allowed moisture to condense between it and the steel hull, which rusted to a point where it nearly split in half. LRF was spending $50,000 per year to maintain the ship.

In 2003, LRF approached Atlantis Submarines, a local tourist concern, proposing to sell Carthaginian II to be sunk as an underwater attraction. Atlantis spent $350,000 on an environmental study and cleaning her in preparation for becoming an artificial reef. On December 13, 2005, the boat was towed and sunk at a depth of approximately 97 feet (30 m), 1/2 mile (0.80 km) off the coast near Puamana Beach Park. It serves as a destination for diving expeditions and submarine tours. Scuba Diving and Sport Diver have rated the site as one of the top locations for shipwreck diving.

LRF was given 120 days to replace the vessel before the berth would be reclaimed for commercial operations. The berth was proposed as a potential home for the voyaging canoes Mo'okiha o Pi'ilani or Mo'olele, but Mo'okiha was berthed at Maalaea Harbor instead in 2016.
