= Lahaina, Hawaii =

Settlement in Maui County, Hawaii, United States

Lahaina Lāhainā Lele
- Census-designated place
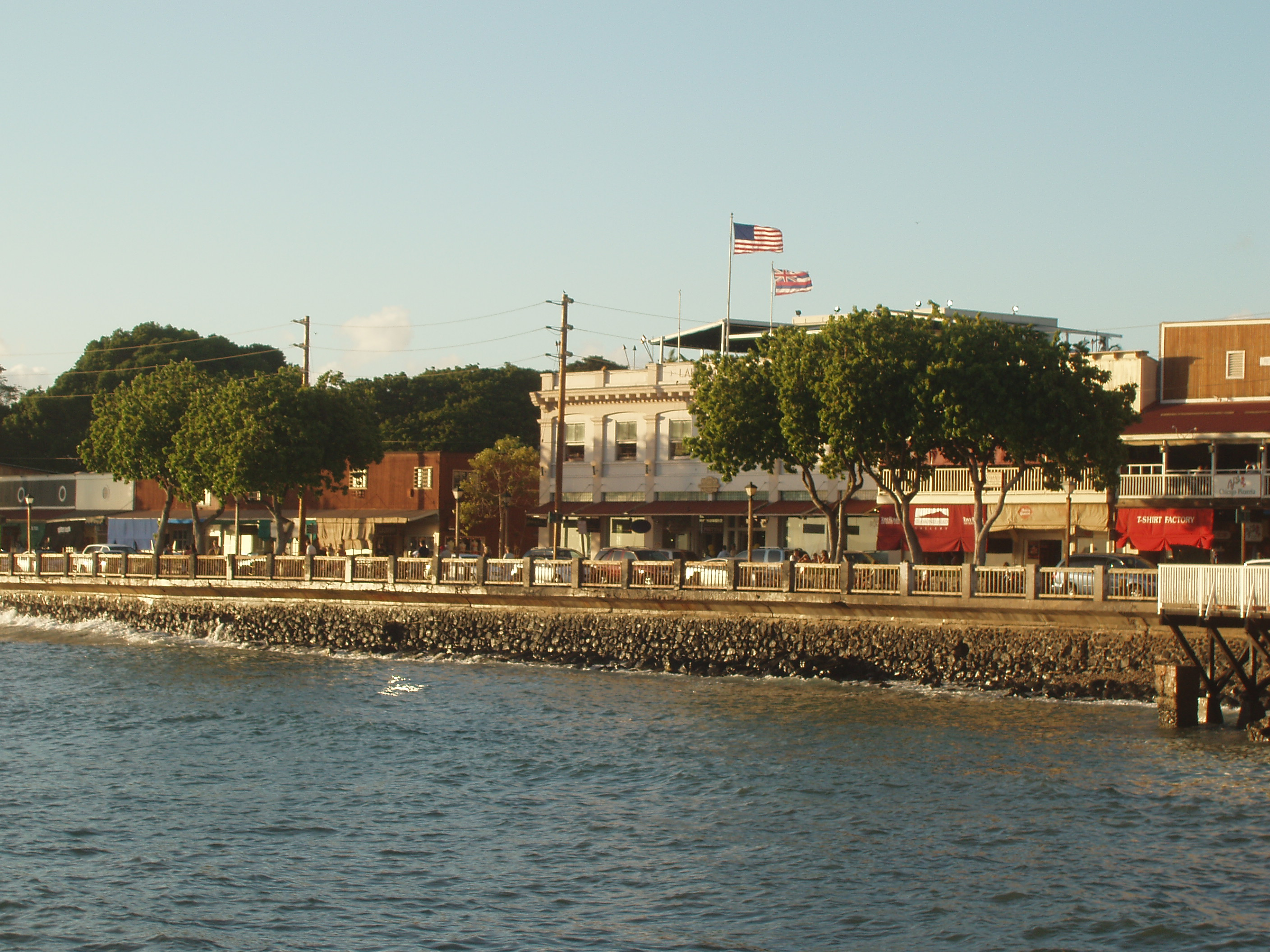
- Downtown Lahaina on the waterfront prior to the 2023 fire

- Location in Maui County and the state of Hawaii

- Location in Hawaii
- Coordinates: 20°52′26″N 156°40′39″W
- Country: United States
- State: Hawaii
- County: Maui

Area
  - Total: 9.29 sq mi (24.07 km^{2})
  - Land: 7.78 sq mi (20.15 km^{2})
  - Water: 1.51 sq mi (3.92 km^{2})
- Elevation: 3.3 ft (1 m)

Population (2020)
  - Total: 12,702
  - Density: 1,632/sq mi (630.2/km^{2})
- Time zone: UTC-10 (Hawaii-Aleutian)
- ZIP Codes: 96761, 96767
- Area code: 808
- FIPS code: 15-42950
- GNIS feature ID: 0361678

Lahaina (/ləˈhaɪnə/; Hawaiian: [ləˈhɐjnə]) or Lāhainā is a census-designated place (CDP) in Maui County, Hawaii, United States. On the northwest coast of the island of Maui, it encompasses Lahaina town and the Kāʻanapali and Kapalua beach resorts. At the 2020 census (before the 2023 wildfire), Lahaina had a resident population of 12,702. The CDP spans the coast along Hawaii Route 30 from a tunnel at the south end, through Olowalu, and to the CDPs of Kaanapali and Napili-Honokowai to the north.

A series of wildfires destroyed approximately 80% of Lahaina in 2023, resulting in the deaths of 102 people.

== History ==
=== Name ===
Both Lahaina and Lāhainā are correct orthography in modern Hawaiian.

==== Modern name, etymology and pronunciations ====
Protestant missionaries sent by the American Board of Commissioners for Foreign Missions (ABCFM) began organizing a way to write the Hawaiian language with English letters between 1820–1826 after they reached Hawaii.

"The long English sound of i is represented by ai, as in Lahaina, where the second syllable is accented, and pronounced like the English word high".

According to Thrums Hawaiian Annual of 1921 the proper pronunciation of Lahaina is La-hai-ná.

Lahaina has different pronunciations depending on how diacritical marks are applied.

Lahaina is a combination of two Hawaiian words, “lā” which means sun, and “hainā” which means cruel. The varied spellings Lāhainā and Lahaina are commonly interchanged when written in modern English, although the traditional spelling “Lāhainā” is still considered proper.

==== Ancient names ====
Lahaina was originally called Lele in Hawaiian and was known for its breadfruit trees. Lele means jump or fly. Albert Pierce Taylor explains its relationship to the area as the "flying piece of kuleana, that which sticks out from the sea".

In 1915, James N.K. Keola, in an article in Mid-Pacific Magazine entitled "Old Lahaina", wrote: "Lahaina is said to have received its name from Lā, the sun, and hainā, merciless. A bald-headed chief who lived at Kauaula Valley, while going to and fro without a hat, felt annoyed at the effects of the scorching rays of the burning sun. He looked up and gazed into the heavens and cursed at the sun thus: He keu hoi keia o ka la haina!" ("What a merciless sun!"). On July 13, 1920, the Star Bulletin published several theories on the name's origins that included the bald-headed chief legend, as well as theories that included the belief that the name goes back to 11th century as Laha aina (Proclaiming land).

Other interpretations of the name include "day (of) sacrifice" and "day (of) explanation". Inez MacPhee Ashdown (1899–1992), historian and founder of Maui Historical Society, believed the name was Lahaʻaina, meaning "land (of) prophecy", because of the number of kahuna nui (high priest) prophecies made there.

=== Early rulers ===
The first mōʻī or aliʻi nui (supreme ruler) of western Maui was Haho, the son of Paumakua a huanuikalalailai. This line produced the subsequent rulers.

The name Lele was adopted during the reign of Kakaʻalaneo. He held court there during joint rule with his brother Kakae, while living on a hill called Kekaʻa. They were the sons and heirs of Kaulahea I. Kakaʻalaneo first planted breadfruit trees while his son Kaululaʻau is credited with expelling ghosts from Lānaʻi and putting the island under the rule of his father and uncle. Kakae's son Kahekili I succeeded his father and uncle as ruler. Kahekili I's successor was his son Kawaokaohele, who was succeeded by his own son Piʻilani

Piʻilani was the first ruler of the entire island of Maui when he extended his sovereignty over East Maui. The aliʻi of Hāna district accepted him as supreme ruler. Piʻilani also controlled the neighboring islands of Lānaʻi, Kahoʻolawe, and parts of Molokaʻi.

In 1738, Lahaina and most of West Maui were the sites of a series of battles between the forces of Kamehamehanui Aiʻluau with his uncle and ally Alapaʻi, the ali‘i nui of Hawaii Island, against his half-brother Kauhiʻaimokuakama with his ally Peleʻioholani, the ali‘i nui of Oʻahu. The war ended in a truce between Alapaʻi and Peleʻioholani and the capture and execution of Kauhiʻaimokuakama by drowning. The remains of the fallen soldiers from both sides are said to be buried in the sands of Kāʻanapali district.

=== Western contact ===
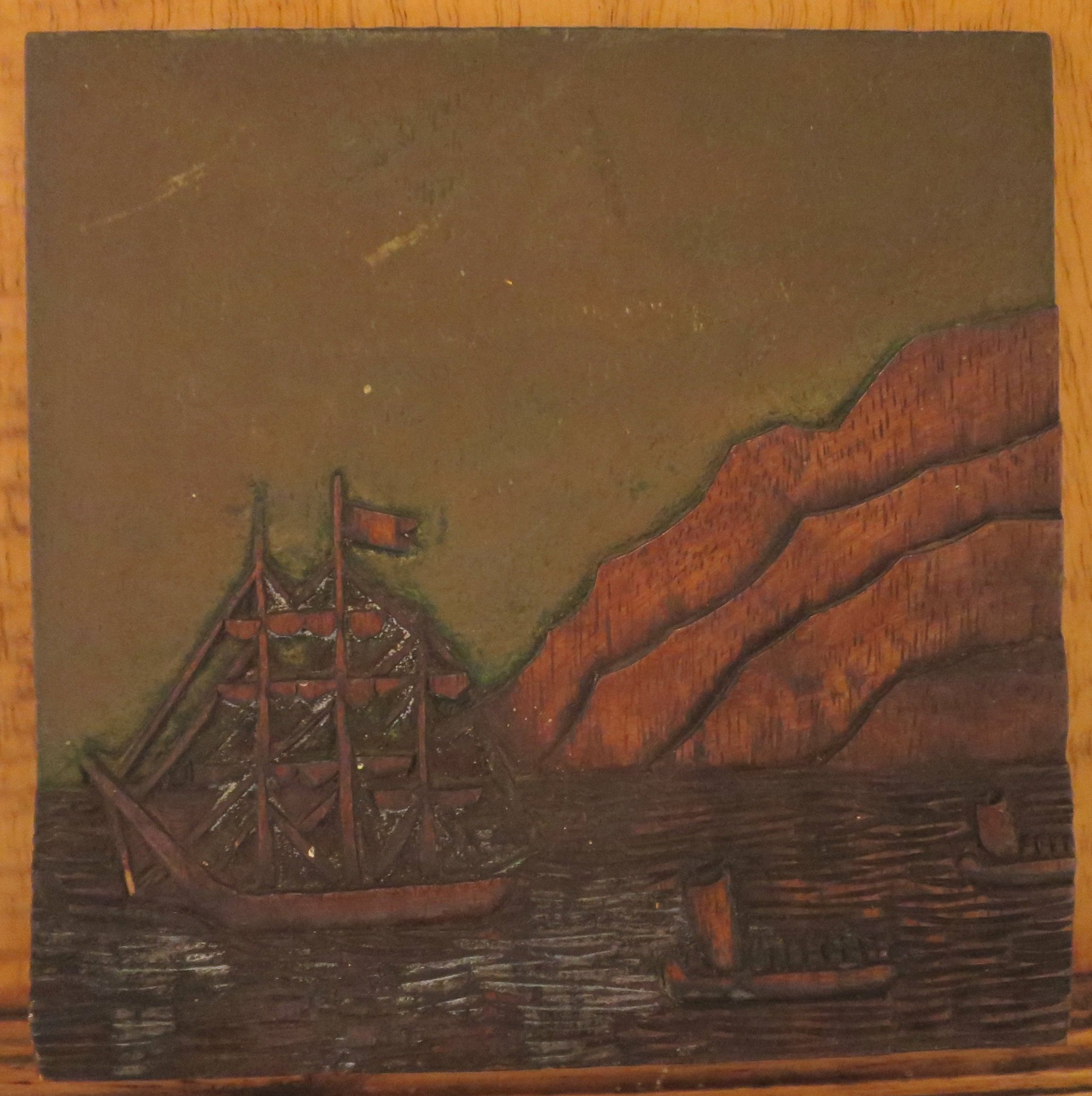
Depiction of Hawaiian warriors meeting Captain Cook off the coast of Lahaina

On November 26, 1778 Captain James Cook's ships appeared near Maui while the island's monarch Kahekili II battled the forces of Kalaniʻōpuʻu, the ali‘i nui of Hawaii Island. He did not land on the island but was greeted by the warriors of Kalaniʻōpuʻu including a young Kamehameha I in their war canoes. The base of the Kamehameha statue in Honolulu depicts the warrior meeting Cook off the coast of Lahaina.

==== Kahekili II ====
British explorer George Vancouver visited in 1793 and unsuccessfully attempted to mediate a peace between Kahekili and Kalaniʻōpuʻu's successor Kamehameha I. During his visit, he gave a description of the constant warfare on Lahaina:

The village of Raheina ... seemed to be pleasantly situated on a space of low or rather gently elevated land, in the midst of a grove of bread-fruit, cocoa-nut, and other trees...In the village the houses seemed to be numerous and to be well inhabited. A few of the natives visited the ships; these brought but little with them, and most of them were in very small miserable canoes. These circumstances strongly indicated their poverty, and proved what had been frequently asserted at Owhyhee, that Mowee and its neighbouring islands were reduced to great indigence by the wars in which for many years they had been engaged.

==== Kamehameha I and Kamehameha II ====
From 1802 to 1803, Kamehameha I stationed his large fleet of peleleu war-canoes in Lahaina. While there, he wrote to the last independent ruler of Kauaʻi, Kaumualiʻi, asking him to acknowledge his overlordship. Although an invasion failed in 1804, Kaumualiʻi surrendered in 1810, uniting the Hawaiian Islands for the first time. Kamehameha II resided in Lahaina from December 1819 until February 1820, when he returned to Honolulu.

==== Christian missionaries ====
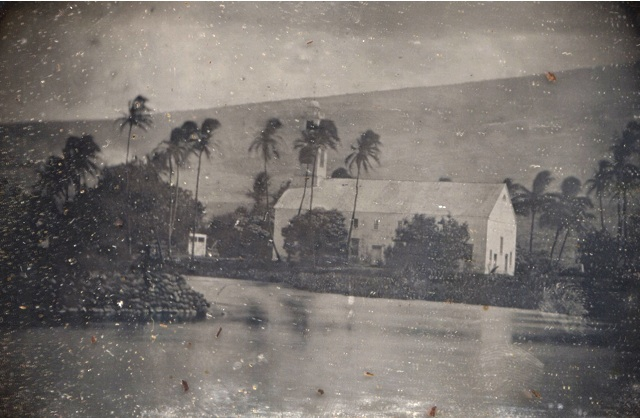
View of Waiola Church and the island of Mokuʻula and Mokuhinia, c. 1855

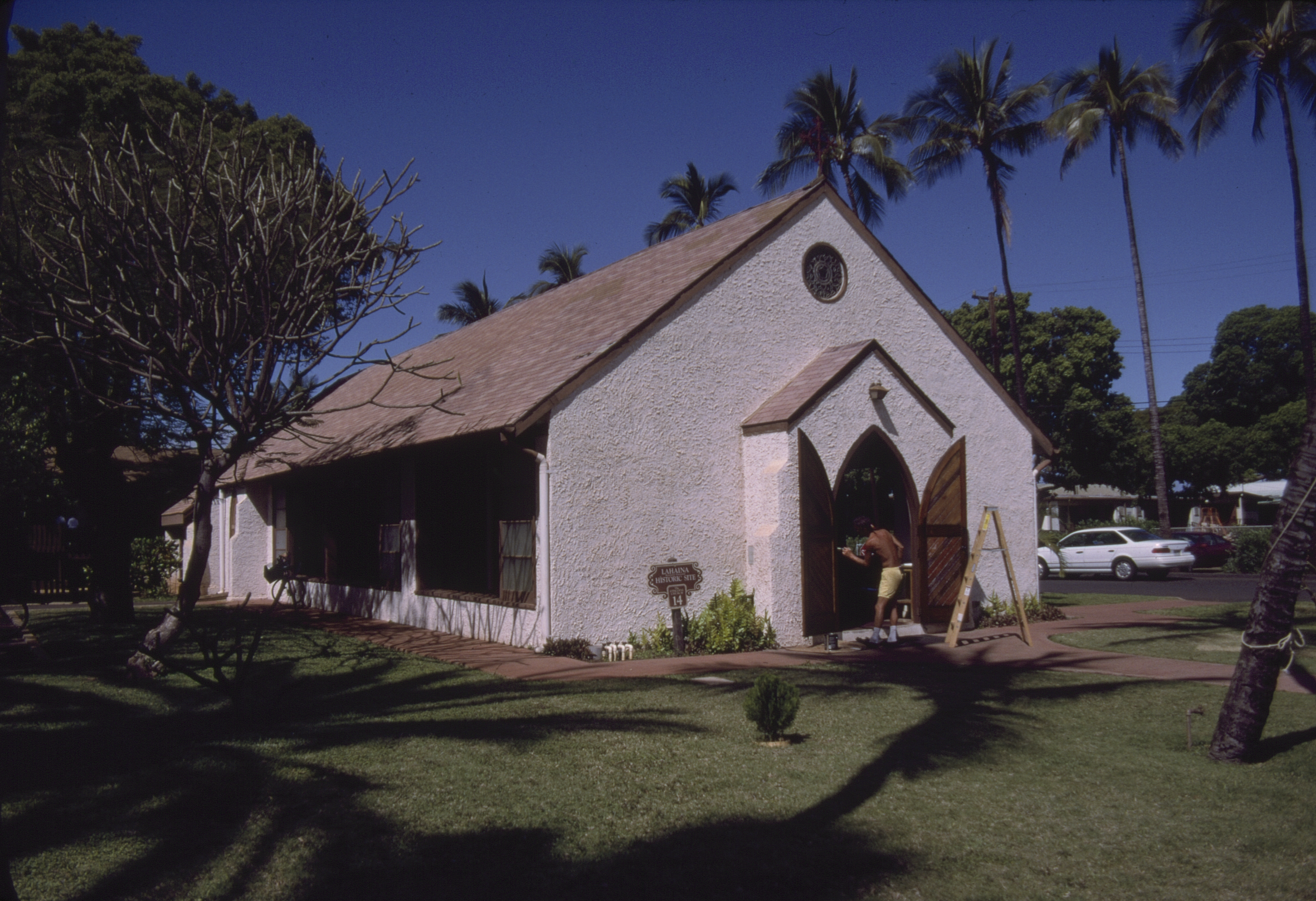
Exterior of Holy Innocents Church c. 1994. Photograph by Alan Gowans. National Gallery of Art Library.

American Protestant missionaries from the ABCFM arrived in the Hawaiian Islands in 1820, setting up stations on Hawaiʻi, Oʻahu and Kauaʻi. However, the first mission station on Maui was not established until 1823 by Reverend Charles Stewart and William Richards. The two men and their family accompanied Queen Keōpūolani, the wife of Kamehameha I, and her daughter Princess Nāhiʻenaʻena from Oʻahu to Lahaina. They were tasked with instructing the queen about Christianity, to which Keōpūolani converted on her deathbed. The missionaries erected a temporary church made of wooden poles and a thatched roof. In 1824, at the chiefs' request, Betsey Stockton started the first mission school open to common people. Maui Governor Hoapili ordered the construction of a stone church. The cornerstone of the Waiola Church (originally named Ebenezera or Waineʻe Church) was laid on September 14, 1828. In 1831, missionaries founded Lahainaluna Seminary (present-day Lahainaluna High School) where Hawaiian boys and young men (among them historian David Malo) were educated in the religion and in crafts such as carpentry, printing, engraving, and agriculture. The school published the first Hawaiian language newspaper in 1834. Teachers and students were instrumental in the translation of the Bible into Hawaiian.

==== Whaling ====
Lahaina was an important destination for 19th-century whalers who came to reprovision their ships with fresh water, fruit, potatoes and other vegetables. The town provided ample rest and recreation for their crew whose presence frequently led to conflicts with the local missionaries. On more than one occasion the conflict became so severe that sailors rioted. The British whaling ship John Palmer in 1827 shelled Lahaina. In response, Governor Hoapili built the Old Lahaina Fort in 1831 to protect the town from disorderly conduct of sailors.

==== Kamehameha III ====
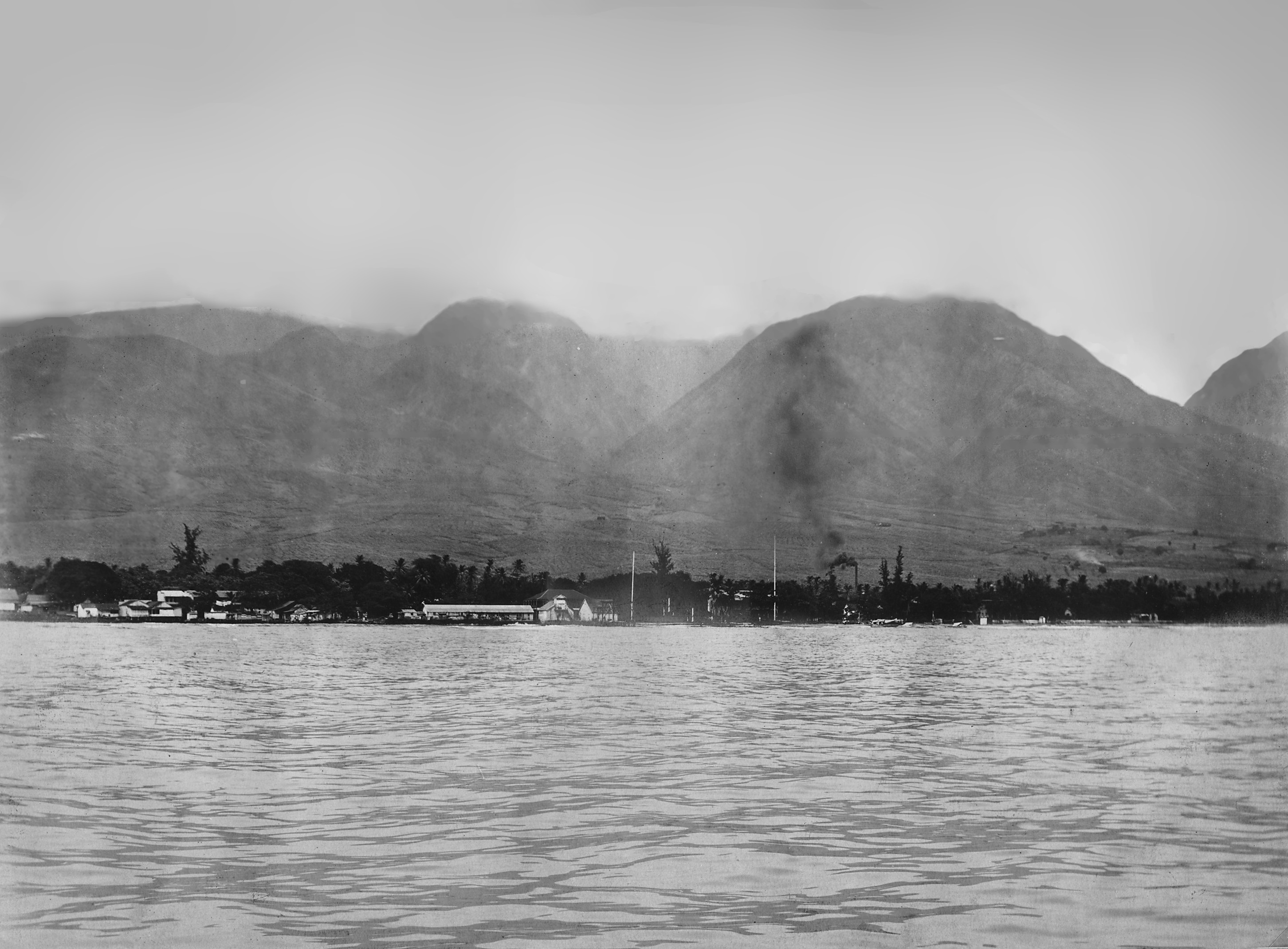
c. 1903–1910

Kamehameha III resided in a traditional royal compound on the sacred island of Mokuʻula located on Mokuhinia lake in the middle of Lahaina from 1837 to 1845. He built a two-story, Western-style palace in 1838 named Hale Piula, although it was not completed before the court moved. During his residence, Kamehameha III signed and proclaimed the first Hawaiian constitution on October 8, 1840, at Luaʻehu, in Lahaina. The legislature's first meeting was held on April 1, 1841, also at Luaʻehu. With the growing commercial importance of Oʻahu, Kamehameha III moved the capital to Honolulu in 1845. Hale Piula was then transformed into a courthouse until it was heavily damaged in an 1858 storm. The following year, the Old Lahaina Courthouse was built as a replacement courthouse and customhouse at a site near the old fort.

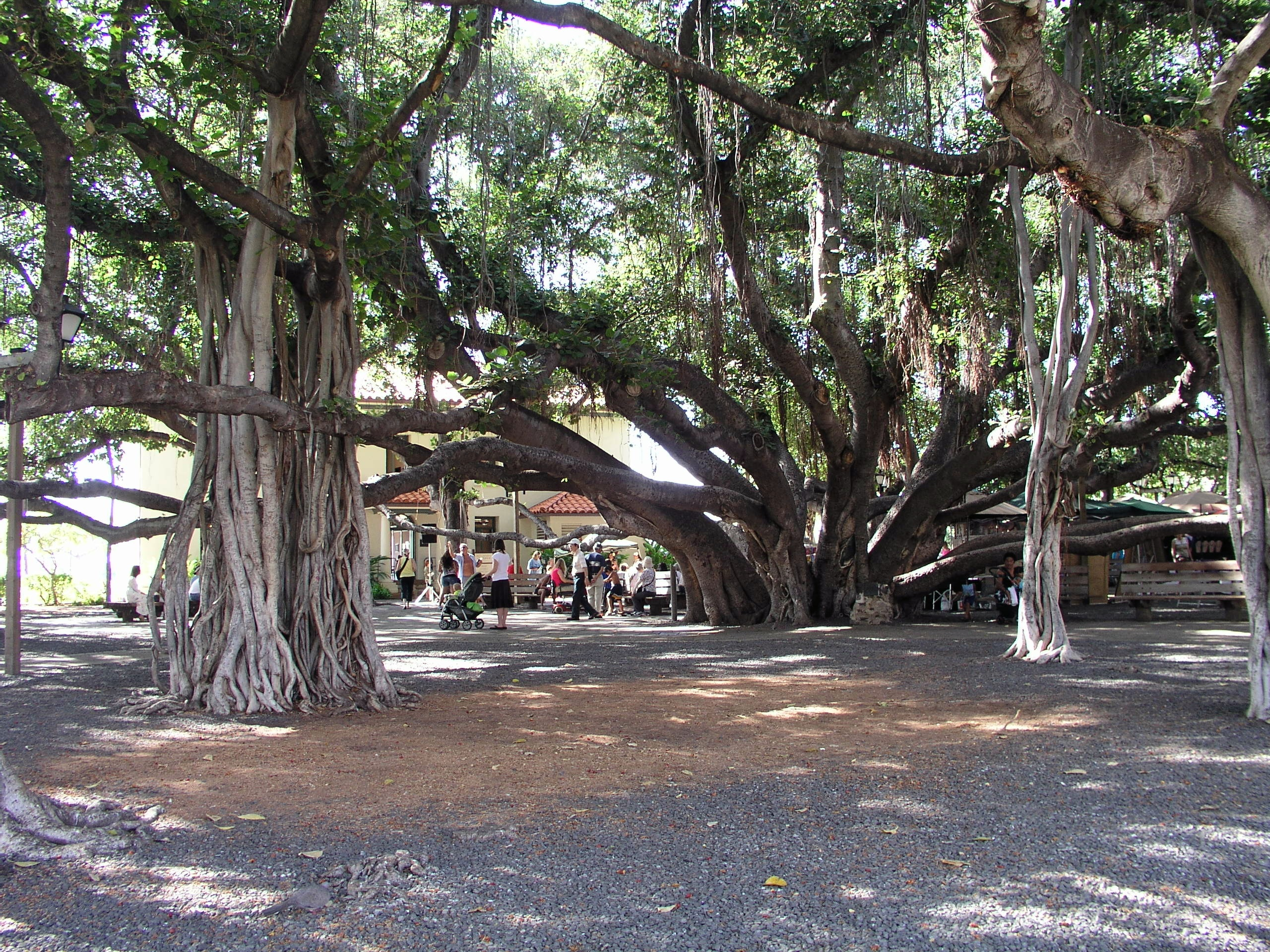
Lahaina banyan tree

A banyan tree (Ficus benghalensis) was planted near the site of Kamehameha I's first palace by William Owen Smith on April 24, 1873, to commemorate the 50th anniversary of the arrival of Christian missionaries. It survived as the oldest banyan tree in the state.

==== 20th century ====
On January 1, 1919, a major fire destroyed more than thirty buildings in Lahaina before it was extinguished by residents. The 1919 fire led to the creation of the island-wide Maui Fire Department and adoption of fire safety standards.

=== 21st century ===
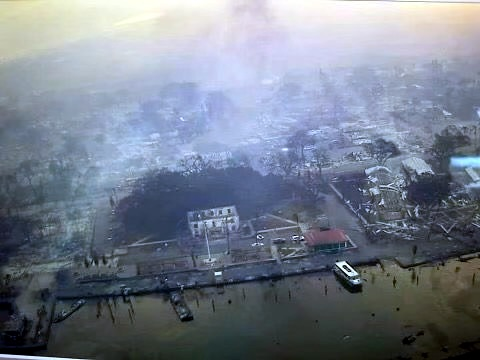
A view of the town after the August 2023 wildfire

Over August 8–9, 2023, much of Lahaina was destroyed by a wildfire amid dry and windy conditions exacerbated by Hurricane Dora, with 102 fatalities occurring in the town.

In 2024, Maui County released plans for rebuilding the commercial district, infrastructure and affordable housing with a completion estimate of six years.

== Geography ==
According to the United States Census Bureau, the CDP has a total area of 9.3 square miles (24.1 km^{2}), of which 7.8 square miles (20.2 km^{2}) is land and 1.5 square miles (3.9 km^{2}), or 16%, is water.

=== Climate ===
Lahaina town is one of the driest places in Hawaii, because it is in the rain shadow of Mauna Kahālāwai (West Maui Mountains). Many different climate zones define Lahaina's districts. Kaanapali is north of a wind line and has double the annual rainfall and frequent breezes. Kapalua and Napili have almost four times more annual rainfall than the town.

Lahaina has a hot semi-arid climate (Köppen BShs) with warm temperatures year-round, fairly wet winters, and dry summers.

Climate data for Lahaina, Maui
Month	Jan	Feb	Mar	Apr	May	Jun	Jul	Aug	Sep	Oct	Nov	Dec	Year
Record high °F (°C)	89 (32)	89 (32)	91 (33)	89 (32)	91 (33)	93 (34)	93 (34)	97 (36)	94 (34)	94 (34)	92 (33)	91 (33)	97 (36)
Mean daily maximum °F (°C)	82 (28)	82 (28)	83 (28)	84 (29)	84 (29)	86 (30)	87 (31)	88 (31)	88 (31)	87 (31)	85 (29)	83 (28)	85 (29)
Mean daily minimum °F (°C)	64 (18)	64 (18)	65 (18)	66 (19)	67 (19)	69 (21)	70 (21)	71 (22)	71 (22)	70 (21)	68 (20)	66 (19)	68 (20)
Record low °F (°C)	54 (12)	53 (12)	54 (12)	54 (12)	57 (14)	60 (16)	62 (17)	63 (17)	61 (16)	58 (14)	56 (13)	52 (11)	52 (11)
Average rainfall inches (mm)	3.15 (80)	2.04 (52)	1.83 (46)	0.74 (19)	0.44 (11)	0.08 (2.0)	0.14 (3.6)	0.28 (7.1)	0.31 (7.9)	0.89 (23)	1.83 (46)	2.90 (74)	14.63 (371.6)
Source: The Weather Channel

== Demographics ==
Historical population
Census	Pop.	Note	%±
1980	6,654		—
1990	9,189		38.1%
2000	9,118		−0.8%
2010	11,704		28.4%
2020	12,702		8.5%
U.S. Decennial Census

The population of Lahaina was 6,654 at the 1980 Census and 9,189 in 1990.

=== 2020 census ===
As of the 2020 census, Lahaina had a population of 12,702. The median age was 38.8 years. 22.3% of residents were under the age of 18 and 15.4% of residents were 65 years of age or older. For every 100 females there were 99.4 males, and for every 100 females age 18 and over there were 98.7 males age 18 and over.

94.6% of residents lived in urban areas, while 5.4% lived in rural areas.

There were 3,589 households in Lahaina, of which 38.3% had children under the age of 18 living in them. Of all households, 43.5% were married-couple households, 21.8% were households with a male householder and no spouse or partner present, and 25.7% were households with a female householder and no spouse or partner present. About 21.7% of all households were made up of individuals and 9.7% had someone living alone who was 65 years of age or older.

There were 4,191 housing units, of which 14.4% were vacant. The homeowner vacancy rate was 3.7% and the rental vacancy rate was 7.7%.

Racial composition as of the 2020 census
Race	Number	Percent
White	3,134	24.7%
Black or African American	102	0.8%
American Indian and Alaska Native	65	0.5%
Asian	5,017	39.5%
Native Hawaiian and Other Pacific Islander	1,322	10.4%
Some other race	678	5.3%
Two or more races	2,384	18.8%
Hispanic or Latino (of any race)	1,423	11.2%

== Arts and culture ==
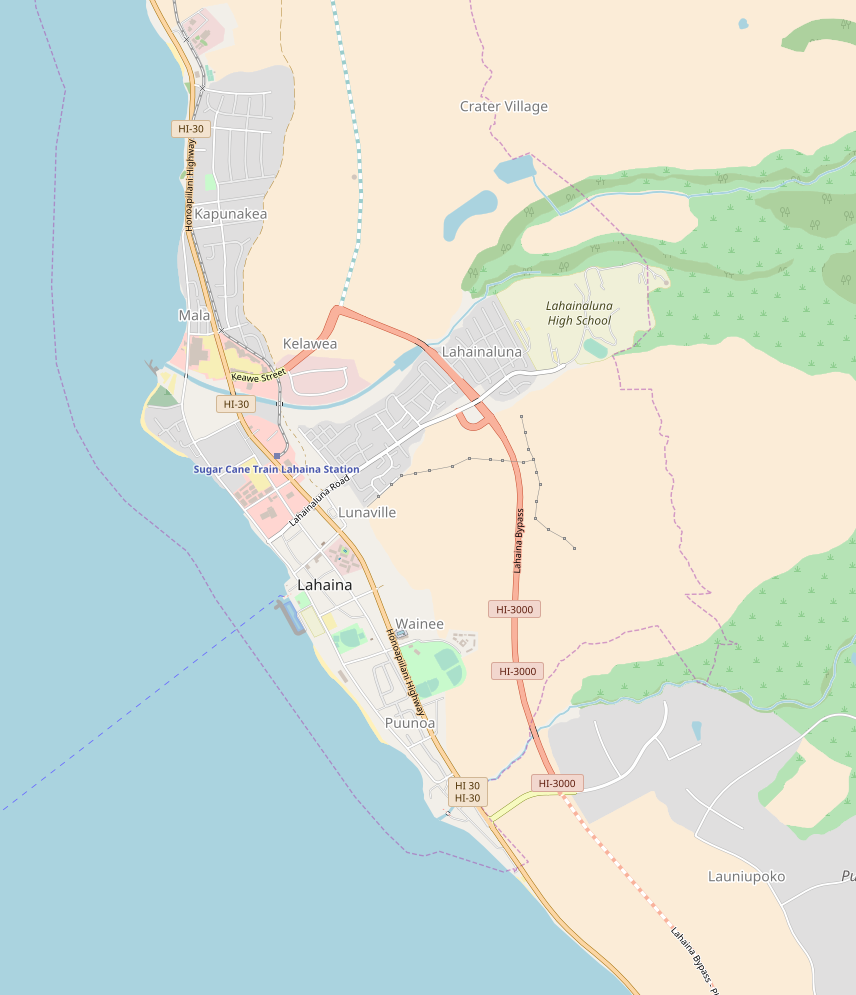
Selected attractions in Lahaina

Before the fire, Front Street stores and restaurants attracted many visitors and was the focal point of the Lahaina Historic District. The Bailey Museum, the Lahaina Courthouse, and the Prison lined the street. The historic district included 60 historic sites managed by the Lahaina Restoration. Front Street was ranked one of the "Top Ten Greatest Streets" by the American Planning Association. The Banyan Court Park featured was the largest banyan tree in the United States, reaching 60 ft (20 m) in height with 46 ancillary trunks covering an area of 1.94 acres (7,900 m^{2}).

The 1831 fort retained reconstructed remains of its 20-foot (6 m) walls and original cannons. Near the harbor were the historic Pioneer Inn and the Baldwin House, a historical landmark built in the 1800s.

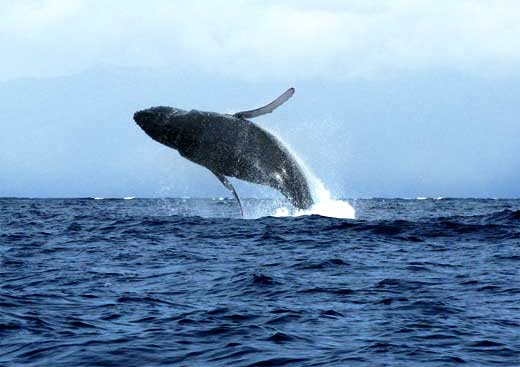
Breaching humpback whale off beach in Lahaina

Whale-watching excursions were a popular pastime. The humpback whale is dominant, although sightings of fin, minke, Bryde's, blue, and North Pacific right whales have been reported. Mala Wharf is a historic pier built in 1922 and a popular spot for snorkeling.

Carthaginian II was a museum ship moored in the harbor of this former whaling port-of-call. Built in 1920 and brought to Maui in 1973, it served as a whaling museum until 2005. It was sunk in 95 feet (29 m) of water about 1/2-mile (800 m) offshore to create an artificial reef. It replaced an earlier replica of a whaler, Carthaginian, which was converted to film scenes for the 1966 movie Hawaii.

Hale Paʻi, located at Lahainaluna High School, is the site of Hawaii's first printing press, where Hawaii's first paper currency was printed in 1843. The "L" in the West Maui mountains stands for Lahainaluna High School which was built in 1904. West Maui mountain valleys are visible from town. The valleys are the backdrop for "the 5 o'clock rainbow" that appears almost every day.

Halloween is a major celebration celebrated in Lahaina, with crowds averaging between twenty and thirty thousand. Front Street is often closed to vehicles, followed by the "Keiki Parade" of costumed children. Adults in costumes join in. Halloween night in Lahaina has been termed the "Mardi Gras of the Pacific". From 2008-2011 the celebration was curtailed following the objections of cultural advisers who claimed that it was an affront to Hawaiian culture, after which the County permitted the event to resume, citing economic reasons.

== Education ==
The school district for the entire state is the Hawaii Department of Education, and it covers Lahaina.

Schools in the Lahaina CDP include:

- Princess Nāhiʻenaʻena Elementary School
- Lahaina Intermediate School
- Lahainaluna High School

King Kamehameha III Elementary School first opened in 1913. Megan Tagami of the Honolulu Civil Beat wrote in 2024 that the school had been "A Source Of Community Pride". The 2023 Hawaii wildfires destroyed the original school. As of 2024 it has a temporary location in Pulelehua, in the Māhinahina CDP, though it has a Lahaina post office address. The temporary campus is adjacent to Kapalua Airport.

The Hawaii State Public Library System operates the Lahaina Library. As of 2025 it is closed for the time being. The 2023 fires had destroyed the library.

== Sports ==
Each November, the Lahaina Civic Center hosts the Maui Invitational, a top early-season college basketball tournament. The 2023 tournament was moved to Honolulu because of the wildfires.

The Lahaina Aquatic Center hosts swim meets and water polo. Tennis events also take place.

Lahaina hosts the finish of the Victoria to Maui Yacht Race, which starts in Victoria, British Columbia, Canada. This race started in the 1960s and is held biannually.

The Plantation Course at Kapalua hosts the PGA Tour's Sentry Tournament of Champions every January.

== Popular culture ==
Movies, literature, and songs about, or filmed in Lahaina include:

- 1959 - James A. Michener wrote "Hawaii", a historical fiction novel where much of it was set in Lahaina. It was the setting for the first Christian missionaries to Hawaii in the 1800s.
- 1966 – Kui Lee wrote and sang "Lahaina Luna."
- 1973 – Loggins and Messina had their song "Lahaina" lead off their 1973 album Full Sail.
- 1976 - The Eagles song "The Last Resort", on the album Hotel California, includes lyrics about sailing to Lahaina and about the Jesus Coming Soon Church.
- 1980 - Some scenes in author Tom Robbins book, Still Life with Woodpecker are set in Lahaina.
- 2000 – Born and raised in Lahaina, Willie K wrote and sang "Katchi Katchi music Makawao" with lyrics that include "play the conga drums down in Lahaina".
- 2010 – Hereafter, by Clint Eastwood, in which a tsunami ravages Front Street.
- 2023 – The Doobie Brothers released a new charity song featuring Mick Fleetwood, Henry Kapono, and Jake Shimabukuro to raise money after the 2023 Hawaii wildfires.

== Gallery ==
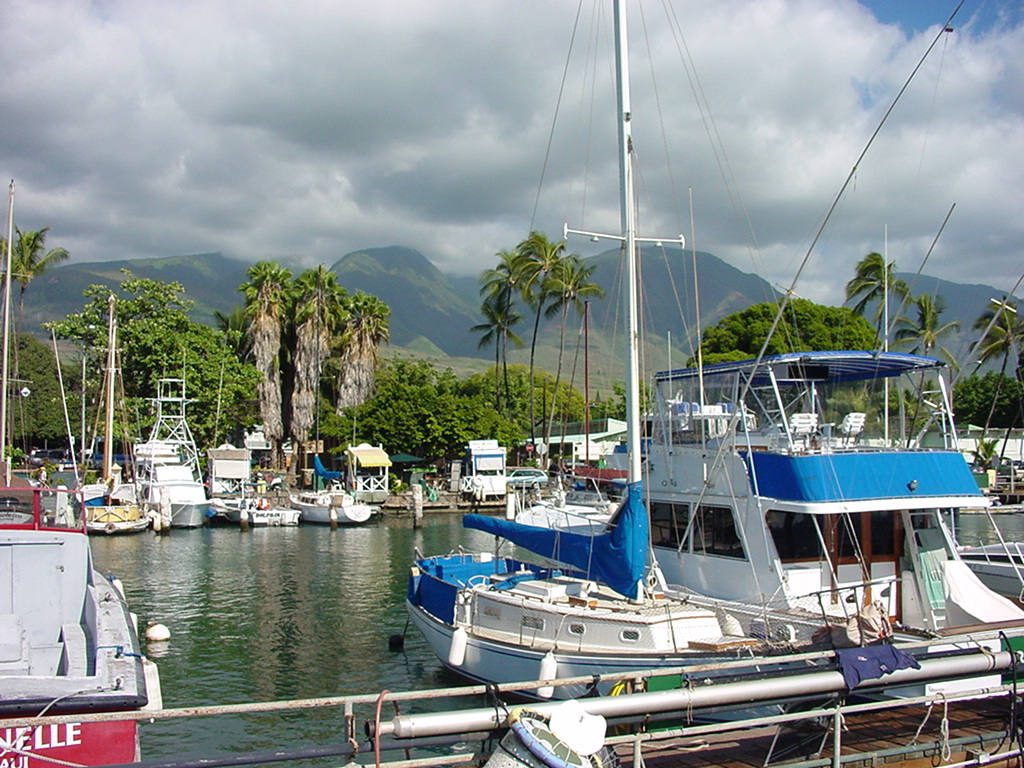
Lahaina Harbor in 2002

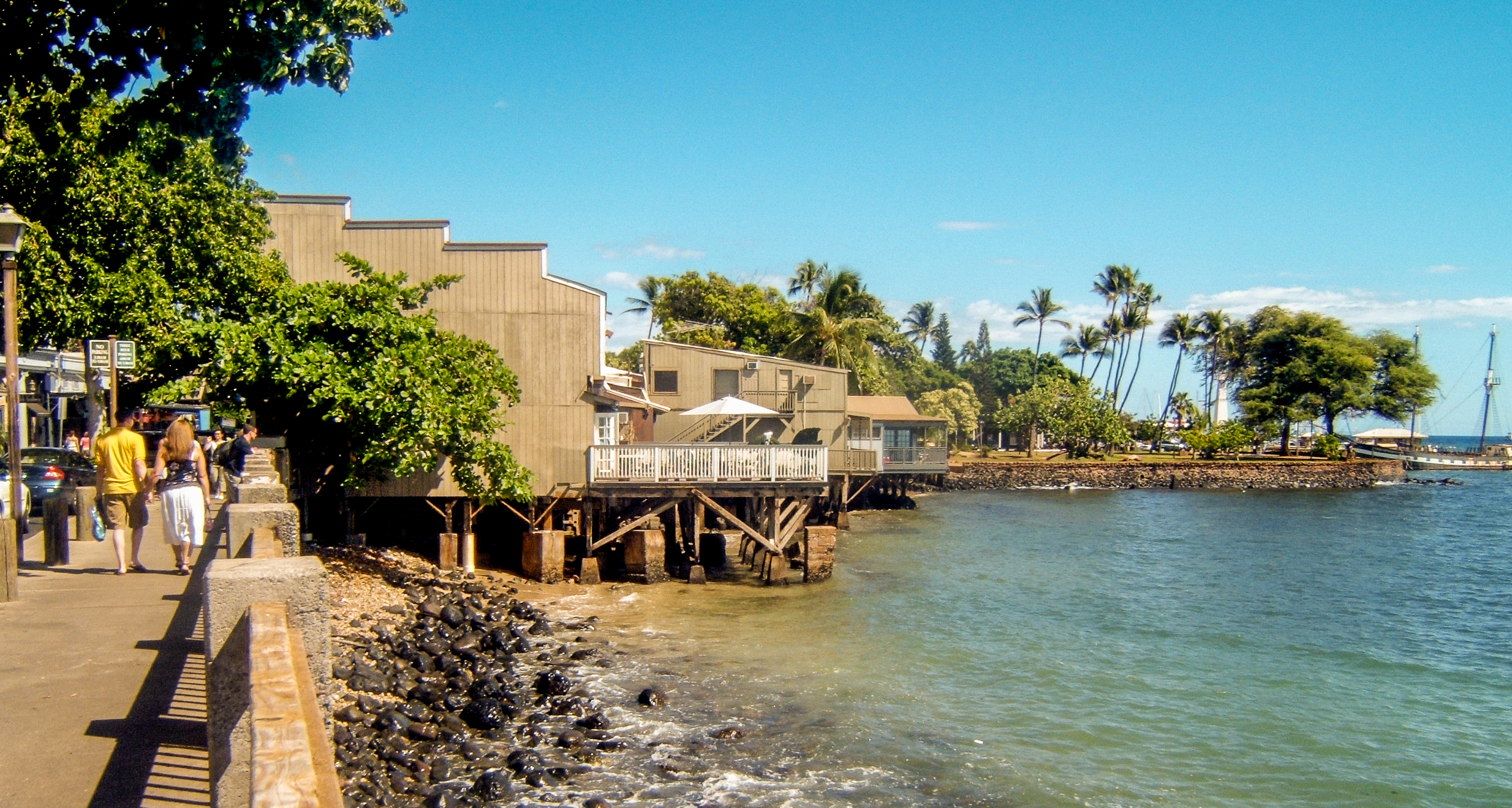
Lahaina in 2005

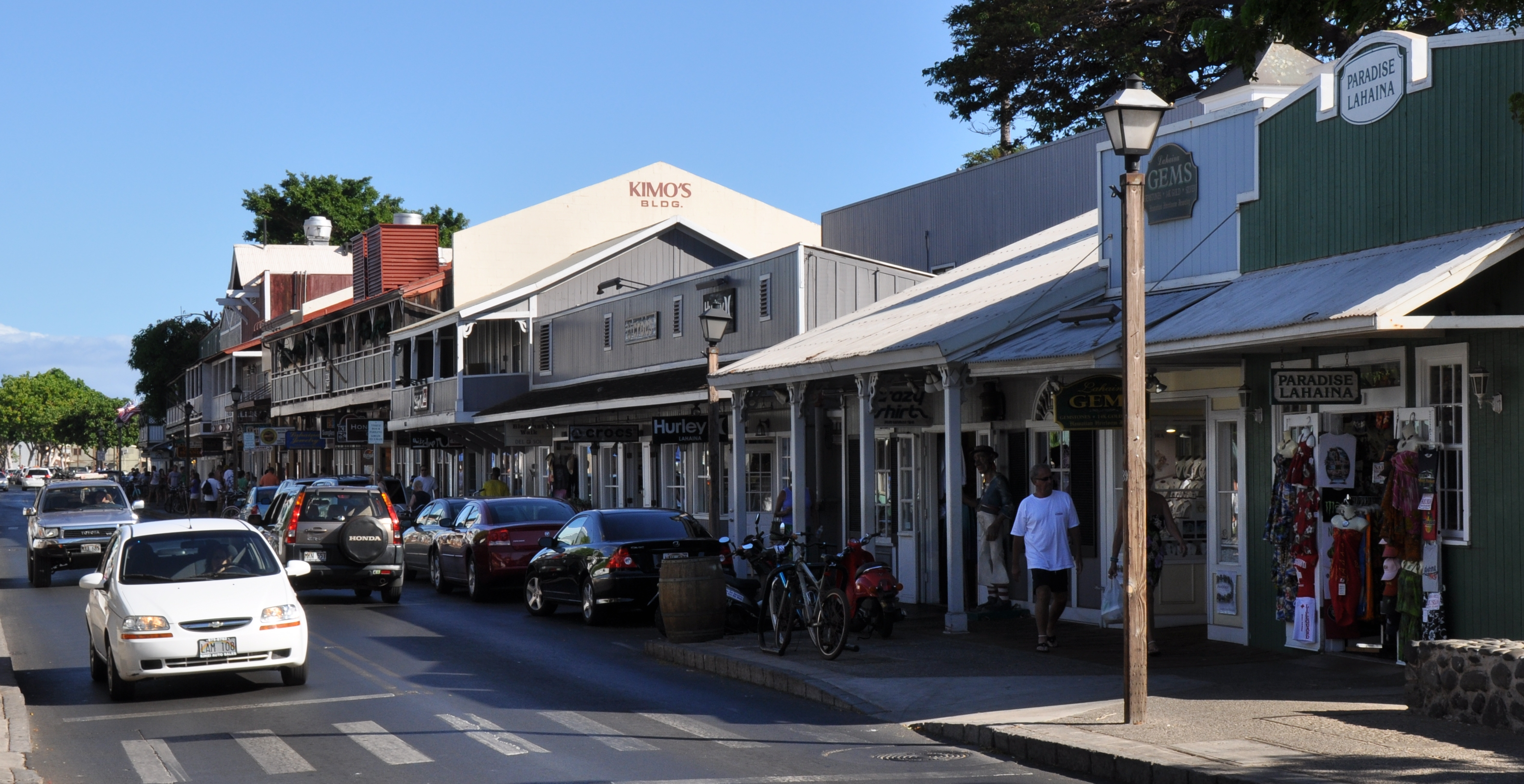
Lahaina in 2010

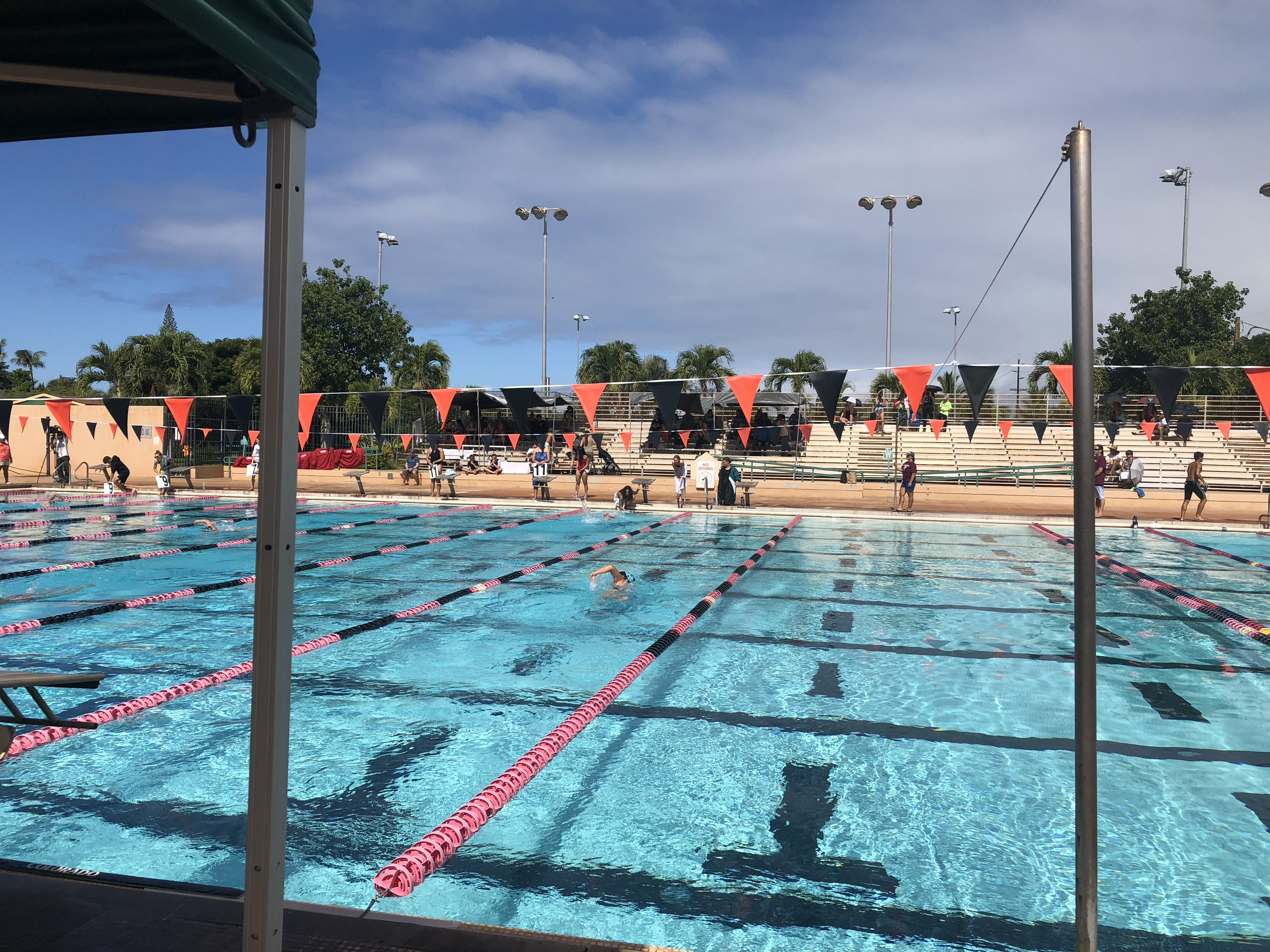
Lahaina Aquatic Center in 2018

== See also ==
- Lahaina Historic District
- Lahaina Noon – Tropical solar phenomenon
- Living Lahaina – American reality television series
