= Pioneer Hotel =

Pioneer Hotel may refer to:

- Pioneer Hotel (Tucson, Arizona)
- Pioneer Hotel (Maui, Hawaii), also known as Pioneer Inn
- Pioneer Hotel & Gambling Hall, formerly Colorado Club, a hotel and casino in Laughlin, Nevada
