= Maria Lanakila Catholic Church =

Historic church in Hawaii, United States

- Maria Lanakila Church
- U.S. Historic district – Contributing property
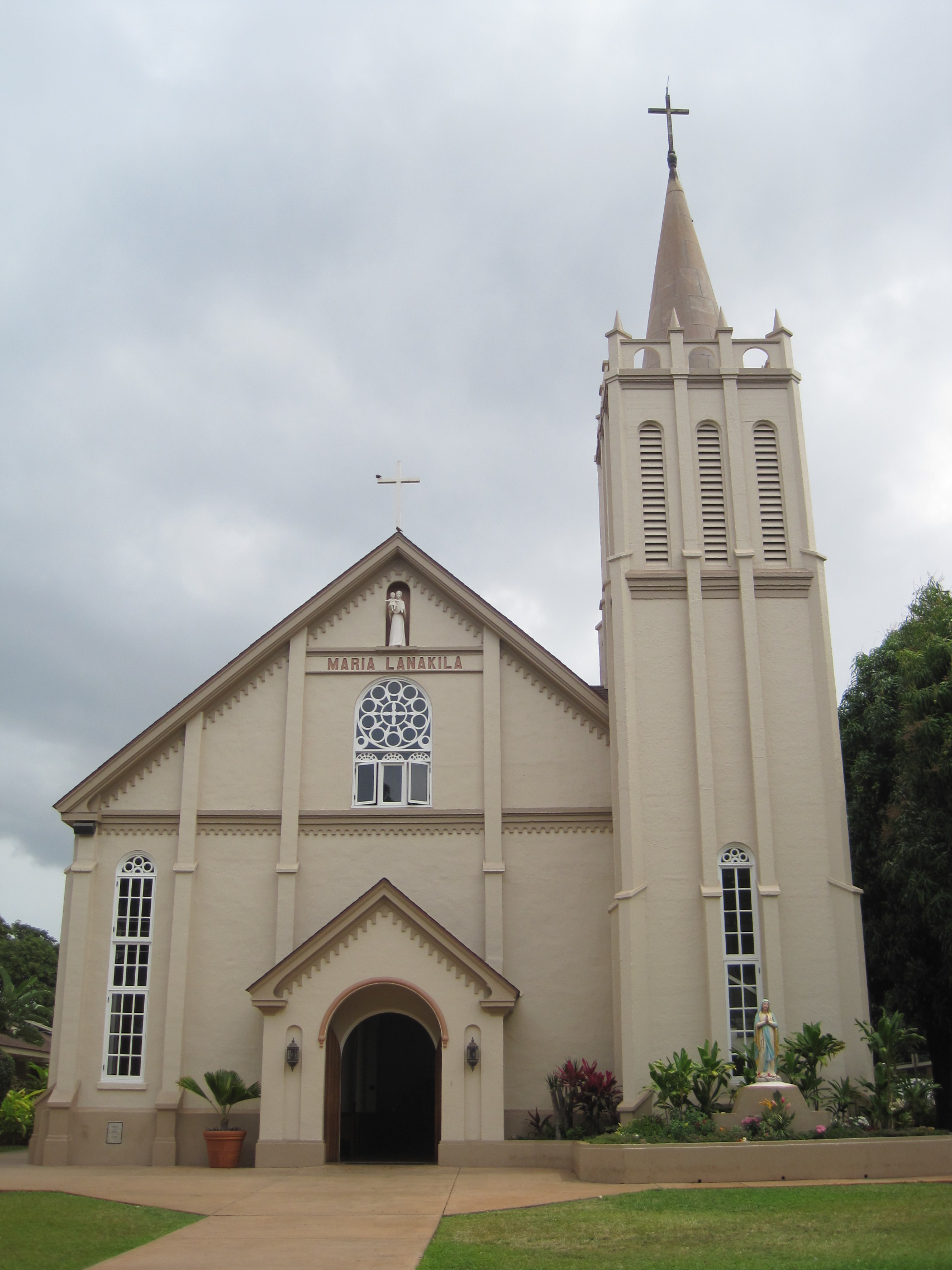

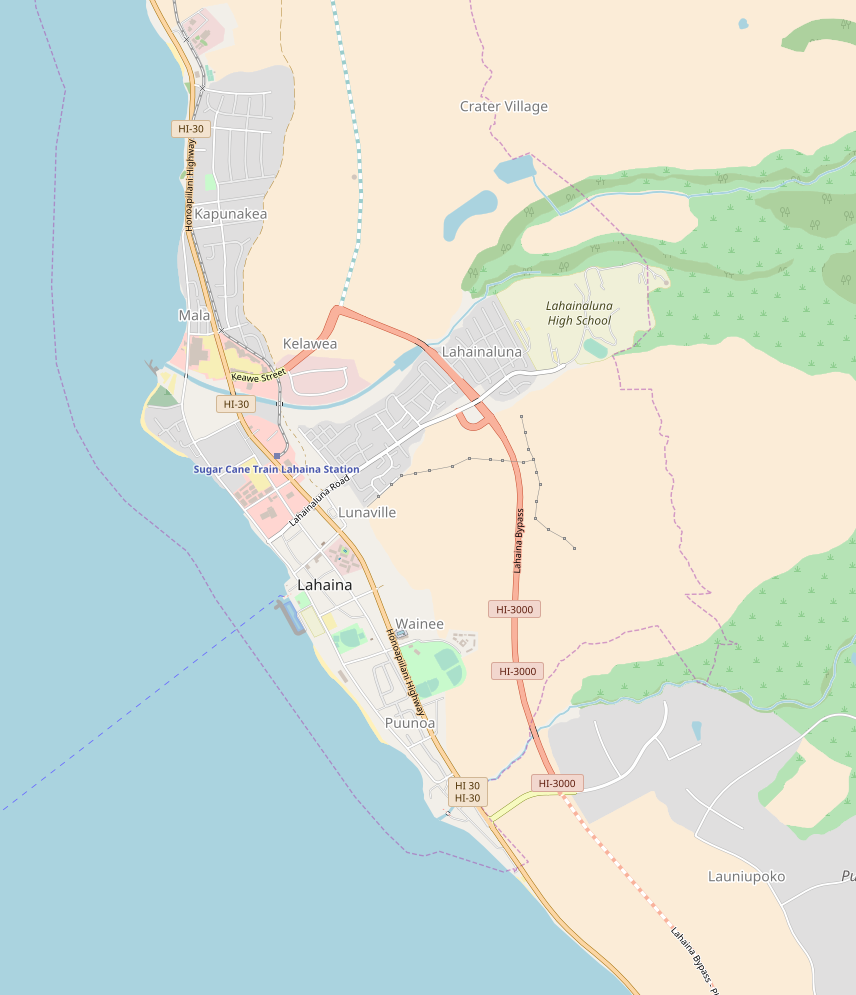
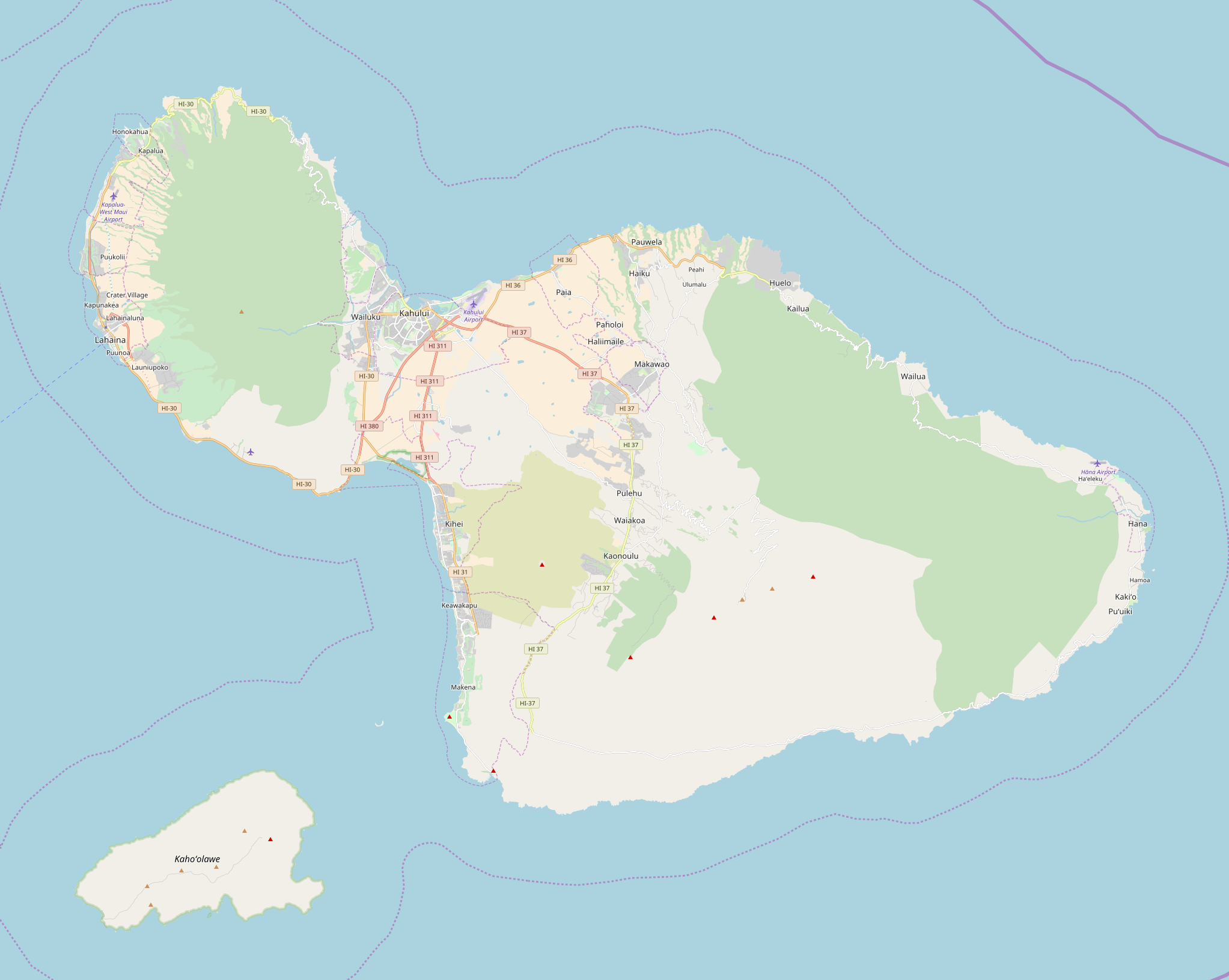
- Location within Lahaina, Hawaii Location within Maui Location within Hawaii
- Location: 712 Waineʻe Street; Lahaina, Hawaii
- Coordinates: 20°52′31″N 156°40′36″W
- Area: 3.091 acres (1.251 ha)
- Built: 1928
- Part of: Lahaina Historic District (ID66000302)

Maria Lanakila Catholic Church is a parish of the Catholic Church of Hawaii in the United States. Located in Lahaina on the island of Maui, the church falls under the jurisdiction of the Diocese of Honolulu and its bishop. The parish has a mission in Kapalua under the title of the Sacred Hearts of Jesus and Mary. Maria Lanakila means "Victorious Mary", the Hawaiian language equivalent to the English language epithet "Our Lady of Victory", which refers to the Blessed Virgin Mary.

The first Catholic priests arrived on Maui on April 21, 1846. The pastor was Fr. Aubert Bouillon of the Congregation of the Sacred Hearts of Jesus and Mary. A temporary church was built on the site, with a new structure dedicated September 8, 1858. In 1927–1928 a concrete church was built on the original foundation. The pastor as of 2020 was Missionaries of Faith Father Kuriakose Nadooparambil. The church was a contributing property of the Lahaina Historic District, designated a National Historic Landmark District on December 29, 1962. It is located at 712 Waineʻe Street.

The church appeared in the ABC television series Hart to Hart ("Harts and Palms," Season 3, Episode 14).

== Spared Destruction ==
In August 2023, the church was damaged by the 2023 Hawaii wildfires. Though initial reports indicated the church was lost completely, Monsignor Terrence Watanabe of St. Anthony Catholic Church in Wailuku noted that the church and rectory were still standing after the fire.
