= Lahaina Historic District =

Historic district in Hawaii, United States

- U.S. National Register of Historic Places
- U.S. National Historic Landmark District
- Hawaiʻi Register of Historic Places
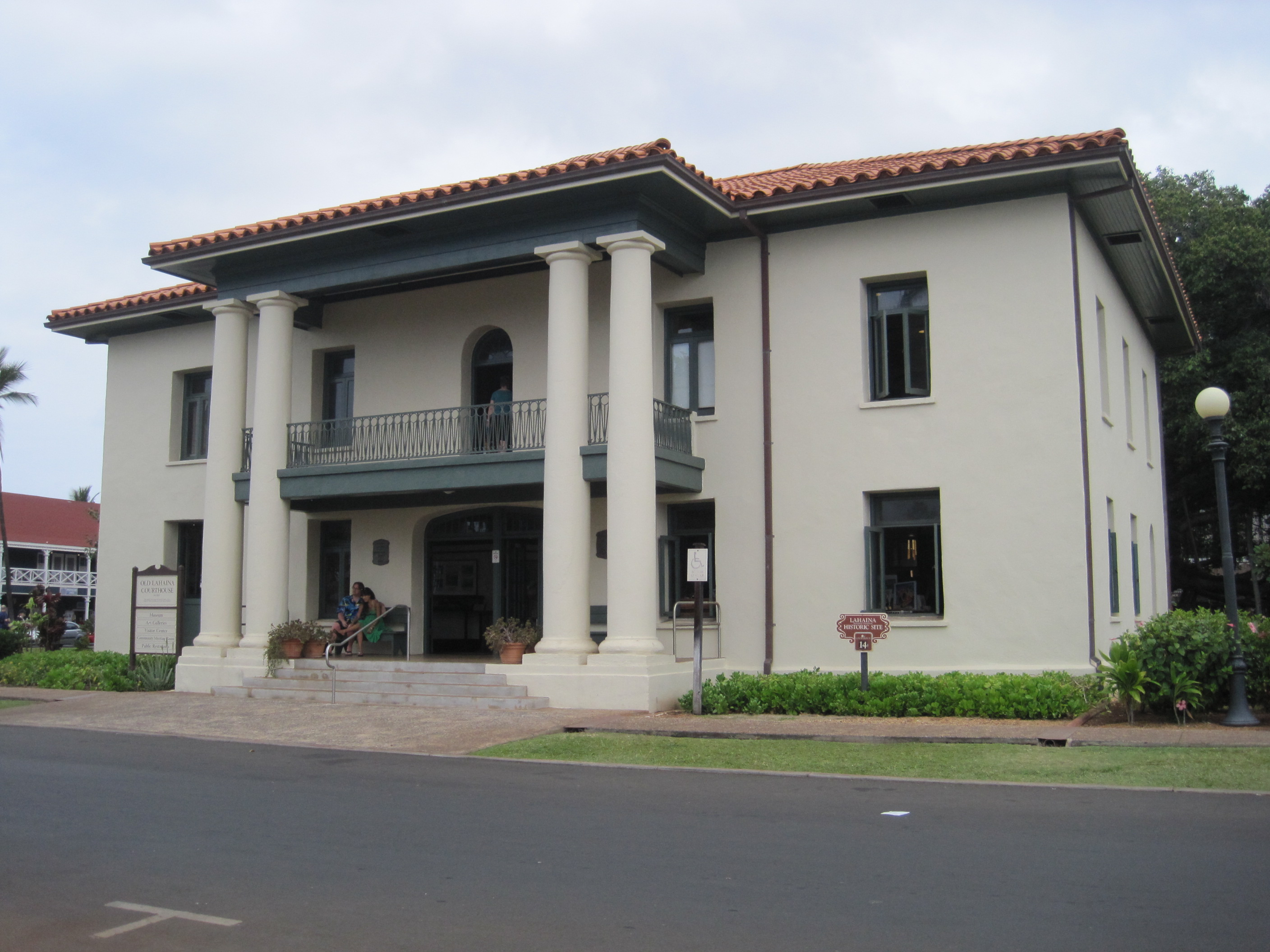
- Old Lahaina Courthouse in 2010

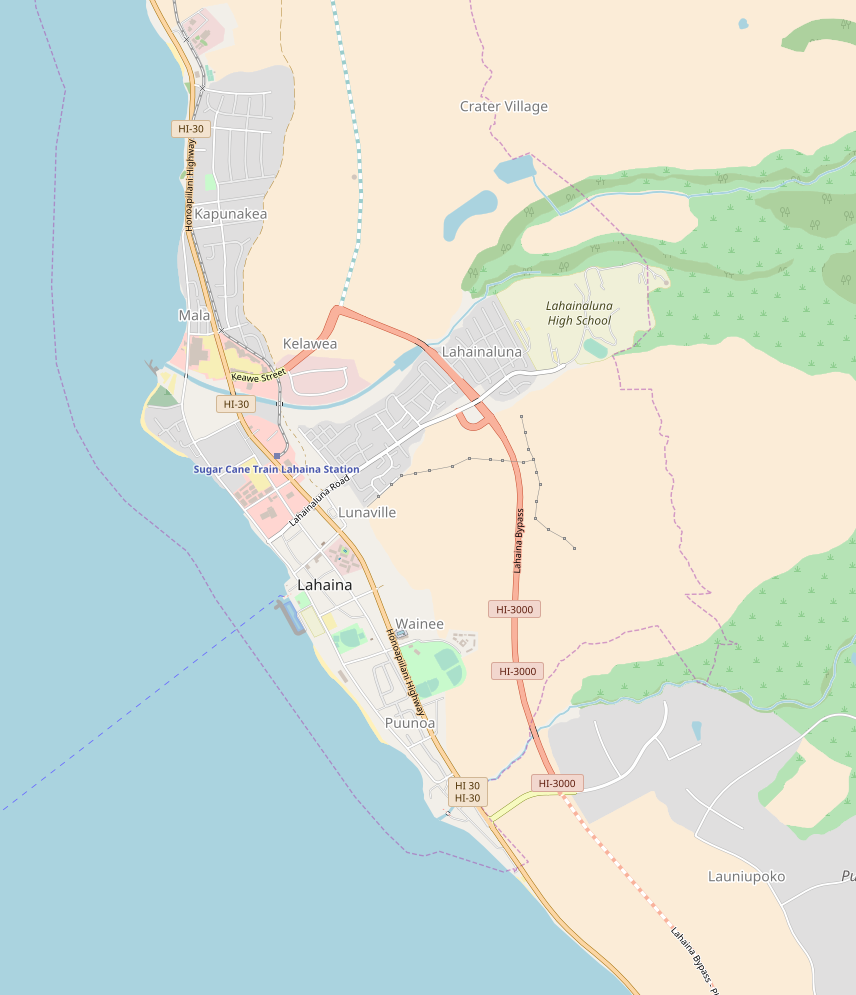
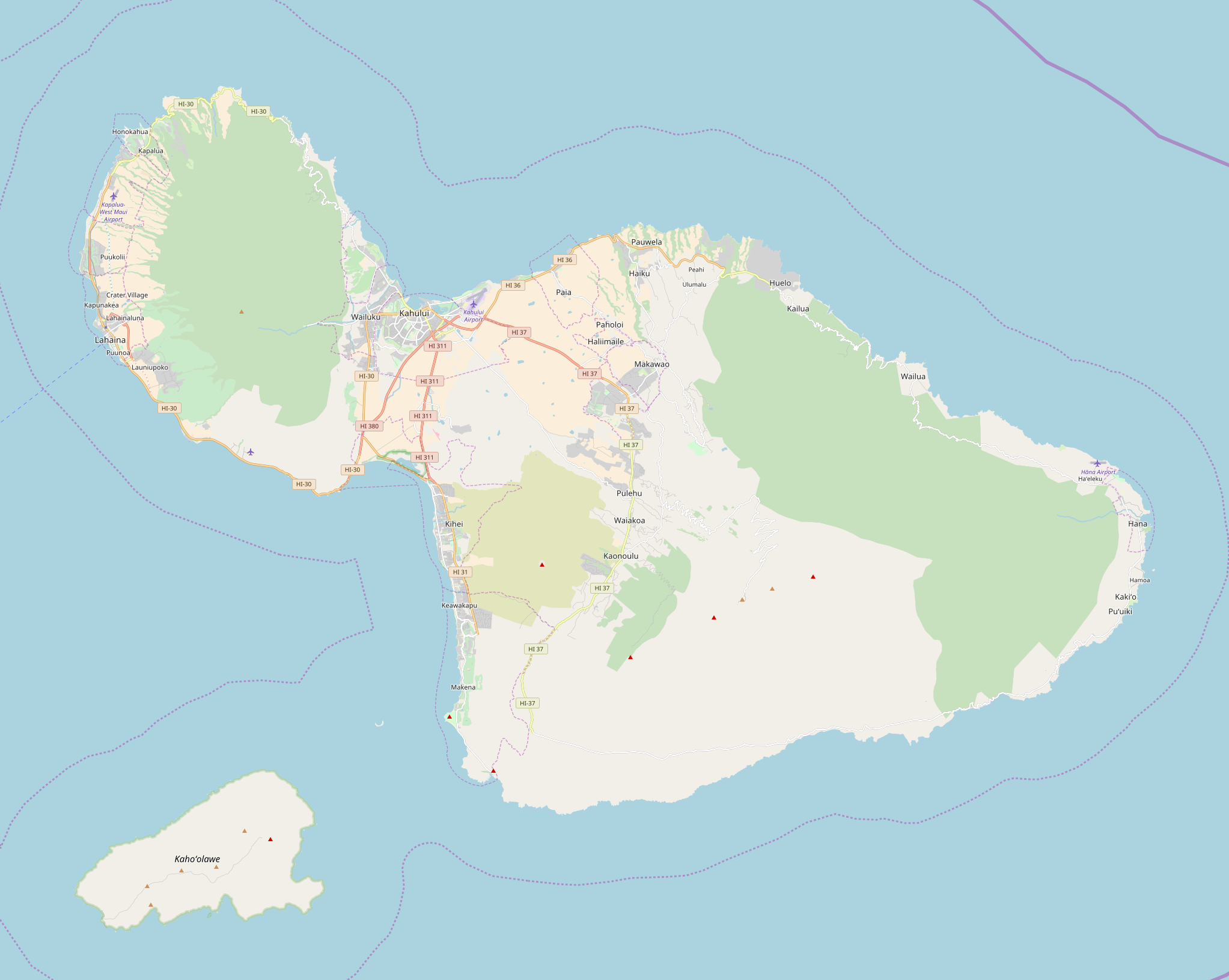
- Location within Lahaina, Hawaii Location within Maui Location within Hawaii
- Location: W side of Maui on HI 30, Lahaina, Hawaii
- Coordinates: 20°52′24″N 156°40′41″W
- Area: 1,671 acres (676 ha)
- NRHP reference No.: 66000302
- HRHP No.: 50-50-03-03001

Significant dates
- Added to NRHP: October 15, 1966
- Designated NHLD: December 29, 1962
- Designated HRHP: October 15, 1966

Lahaina Historic District is a National Historic Landmark District encompassing most of the community of Lahaina, Hawaii, on the west side of the island of Maui in the US state of Hawaii. Designated in 1962, the district recognizes Lahaina for its well-preserved character as a 19th-century port, and for its social and economic importance in the 19th century as a major whaling center in the Pacific, and as one of the capital cities of the Kingdom of Hawaii.

Lahaina was a popular residential center for the kings of Maui prior to the arrival of European explorers in the late 18th century. Kamehameha I made his landing here when he began the conquest of Maui in 1795, and Kamehameha II established a residence here in 1819. That same year, the first whaling ships arrived, beginning the community's rise in economic importance. Lahaina eclipsed Oahu as a preferred whaling port between 1840 and 1855, because of its better deep-water anchorage. When Kamehameha III ascended to the Hawaiian throne in 1825, he made Lahaina his capital, preferring it to the busier Honolulu. The town declined in economic importance in the 1860s, as the whaling industry waned.

It was declared a National Historic Landmark in 1962. The district is bounded on the north by Puʻuona Point, the south by Makila Point, and the east by the ridge of hills above the town. Its western bound extends all the way out to the island of Lānaʻi, encompassing the Lahaina Roads, the roadstead which enabled the town's growth in the 19th century. Donn Beach and Pete Wimberly played an important early role in establishing building ordinances to govern restoration and preservation projects in Lahaina.

== Buildings ==
When the landmark district was designated in 1962, nine buildings were called out for their specific contribution to the district. The Historic American Buildings Survey collected detailed drawings in the 1960s and 1970s. The district suffered catastrophic damage in the 2023 Hawaii wildfires, with most historic structures gutted (highlighted in yellow) or completely destroyed (highlighted in red).

Contributing buildings in the Lahaina Historic District
No	Name	Year	Notes	Thumbnail
1	Baldwin House	1835	A two-story home used by early missionaries, including Rev. Dwight Baldwin. Destroyed in the 2023 Hawaii wildfires.	
2	Old Spring House	1823	Built by Rev. William Richards to enclose a spring and used for fresh water by the community. Ruins of outer walls were left standing after the August 2023 wildfire, roof and interior destroyed.	
3	Court House	1859	Replaced the Hale Piula, a former palace used for government offices damaged during an 1858 windstorm. Rebuilt in 1925 with significantly altered appearance. Ruins of outer walls were left standing after the 2023 wildfire, roof and interior destroyed.	
4	Old Prison (Hale Paʻahao)	1852	Main cell block (plank structure) completed in 1852, and enclosing coral-block wall completed in 1854. Original cell block burned in 1958; reconstructed in 1959 along with the wooden gate house. Coral-block walls were left standing after the 2023 wildfire, gate house and cell block were destroyed.	
5	Waineʻe (now Waiola) Church	1953	Construction started in 1828 and completed in 1832. Destroyed by winds twice and again by fire in 1894. Present structure was completed in 1953, when the name was changed to Waiola. Hawaiian nobility are interred in the cemetery, which dates to 1823. Destroyed in the 2023 wildfire.	
6	Hale Aloha	1858	Meeting house completed in 1858, replacing an earlier stone church dating to 1823. School house and church, restored in the 1980s. Ruins of outer walls were left standing after the 2023 wildfire, roof, bell tower and interior destroyed.	
7	United States Marine Hospital	1842	Herman Melville noted one of his shipmates died at this hospital in 1843. Sold in 1865 and served as a school for girls, then a vicarage for the Episcopal Church. Ruins of outer walls were left standing after the 2023 wildfire, roof and interior destroyed.	
8	Maria Lanakila Catholic Church	1858	This church, erected in 1858, replaced an earlier church at the same site built in 1846. The present building was erected in 1928 on the same foundation, but is said to be an exact replica of the 1858 structure. Survived the 2023 wildfire.	
9	Pioneer Inn	1901	Lahaina's first hotel. Destroyed in the 2023 wildfire.	

== Gallery ==
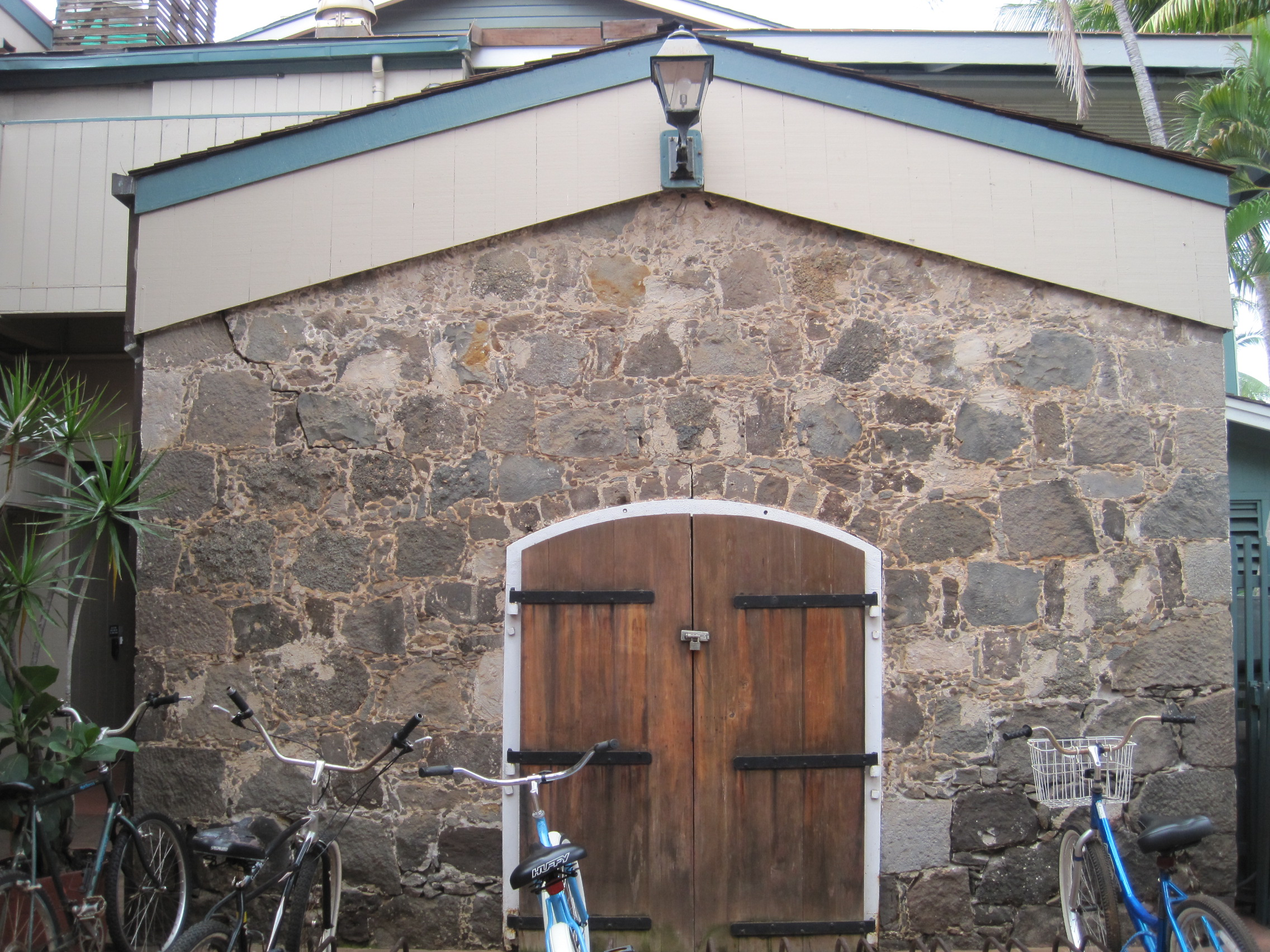
Old Spring House, 1823

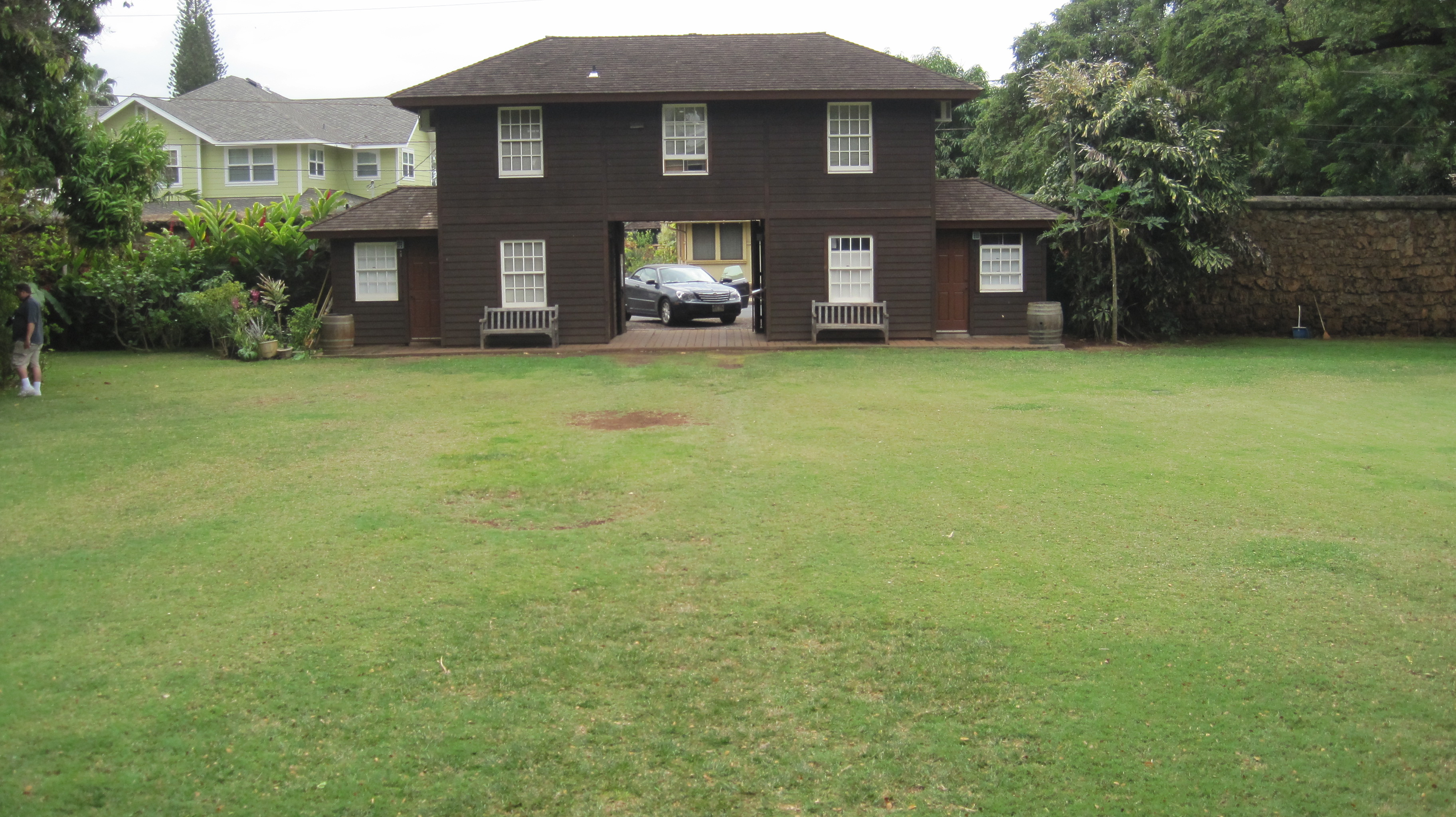
Old Prison yard & gatehouse, 1830s

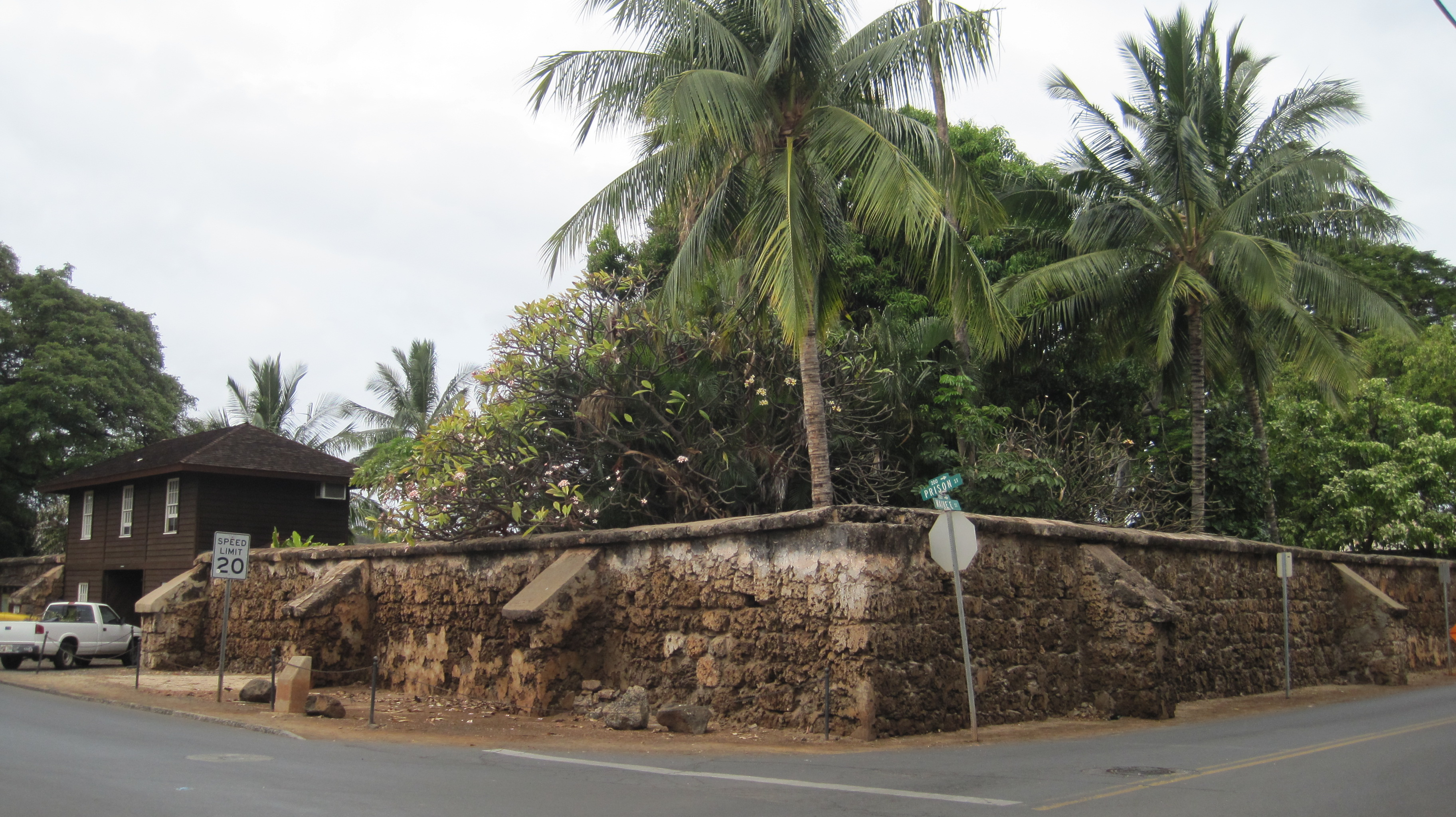
Old Prison outer wall, 1830s

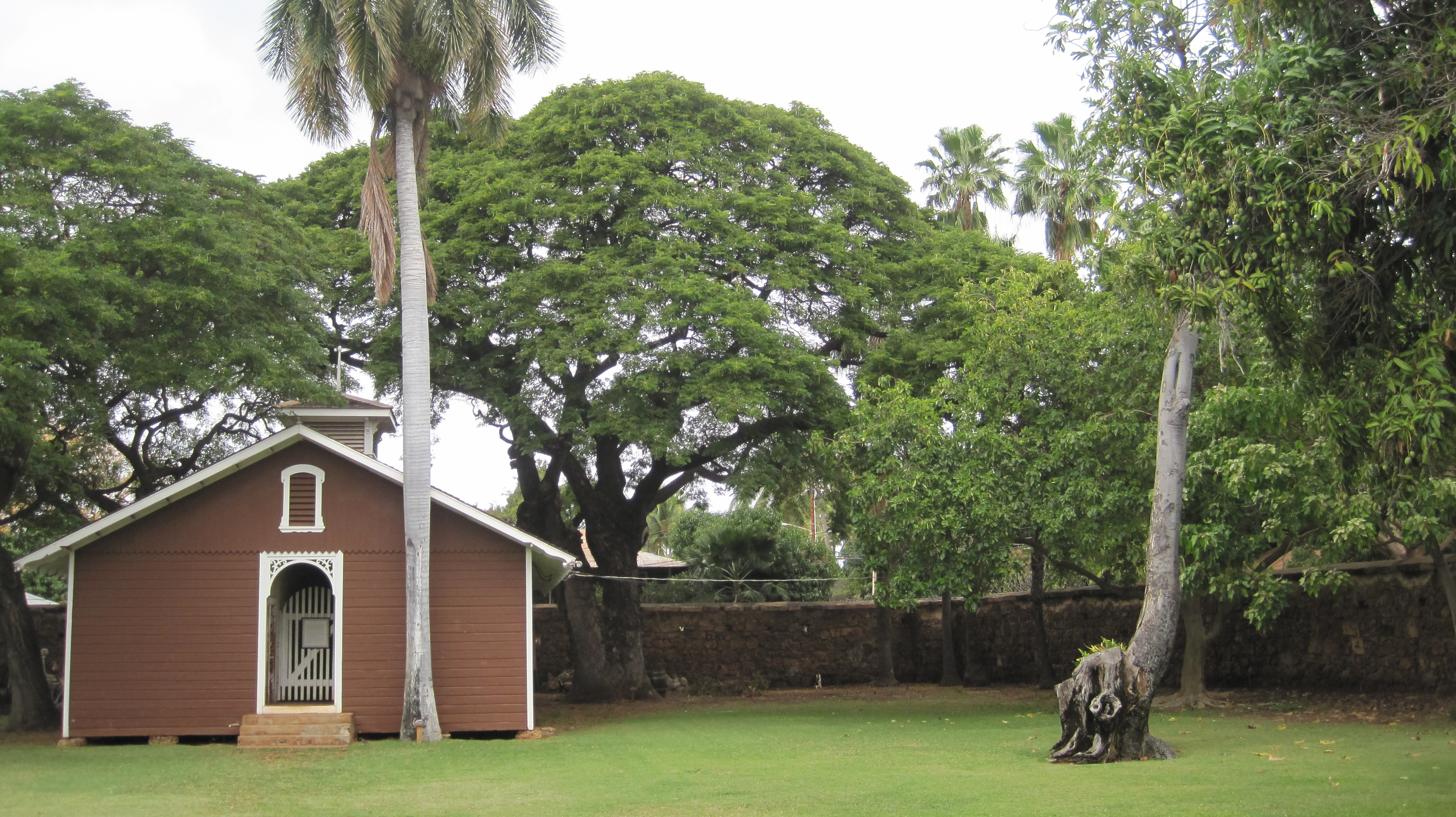
Old Prison cellblock, 1830s

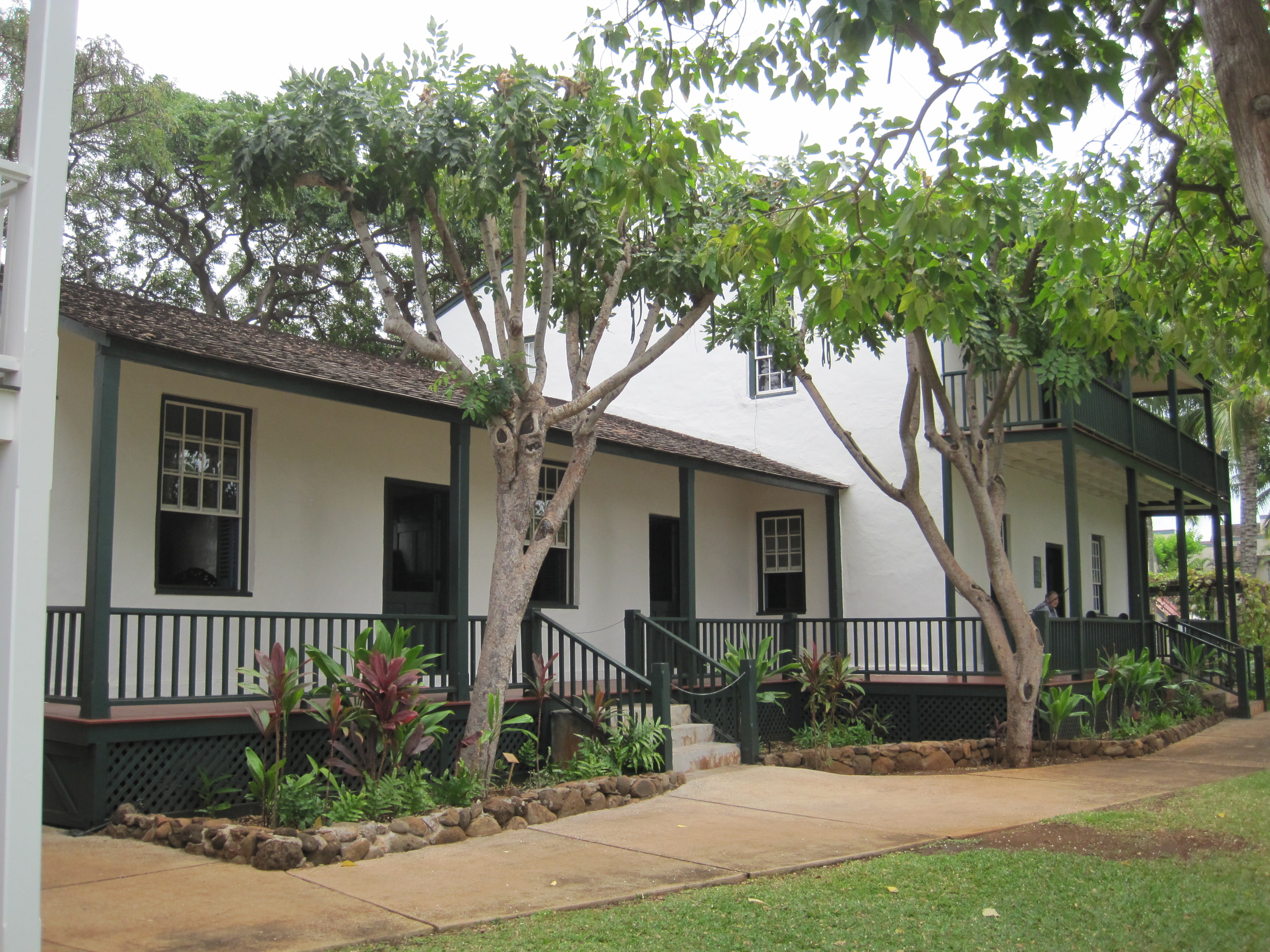
Baldwin House, 1834–1849

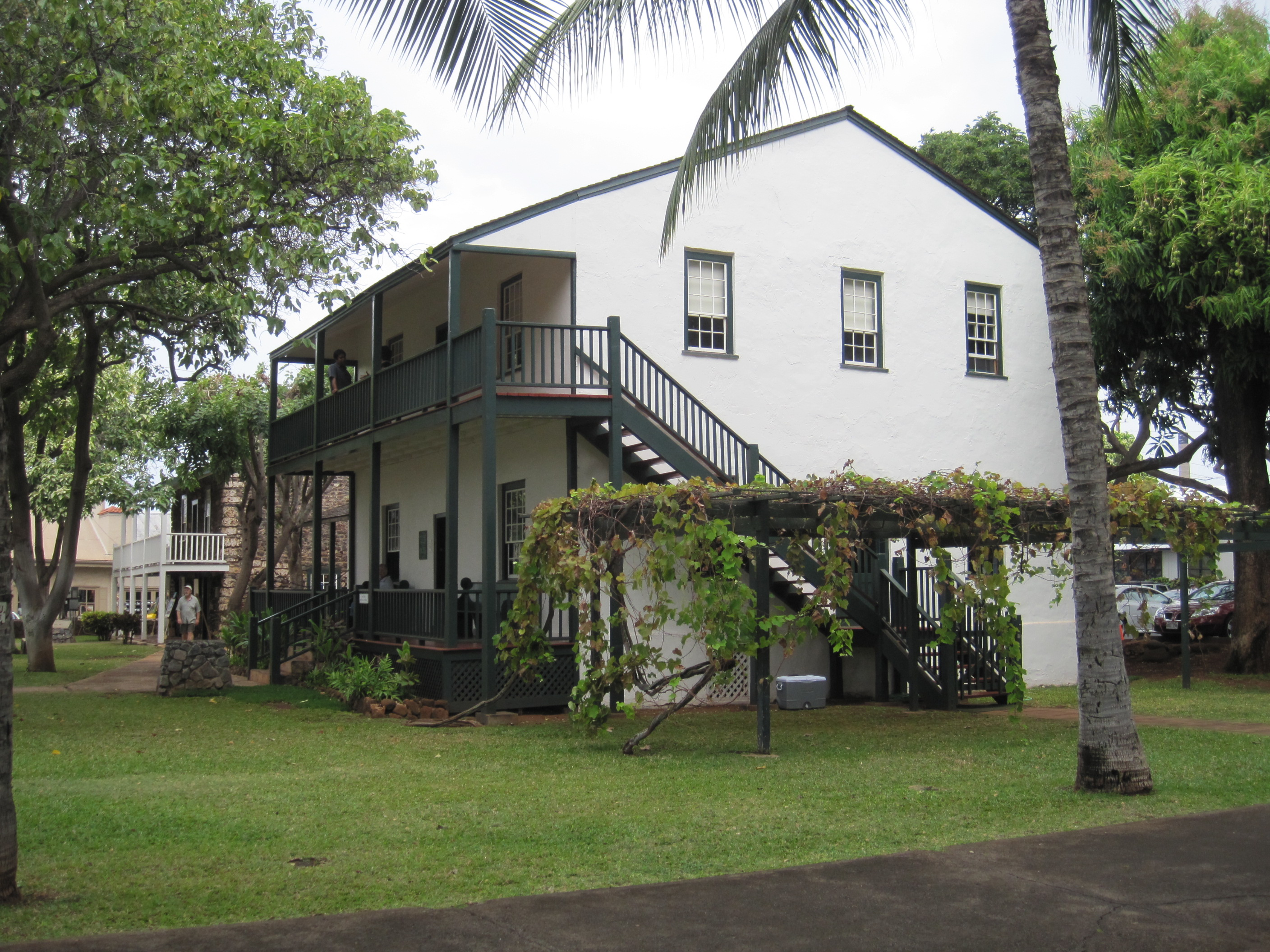
Baldwin House with grape arbor, 1834–1849

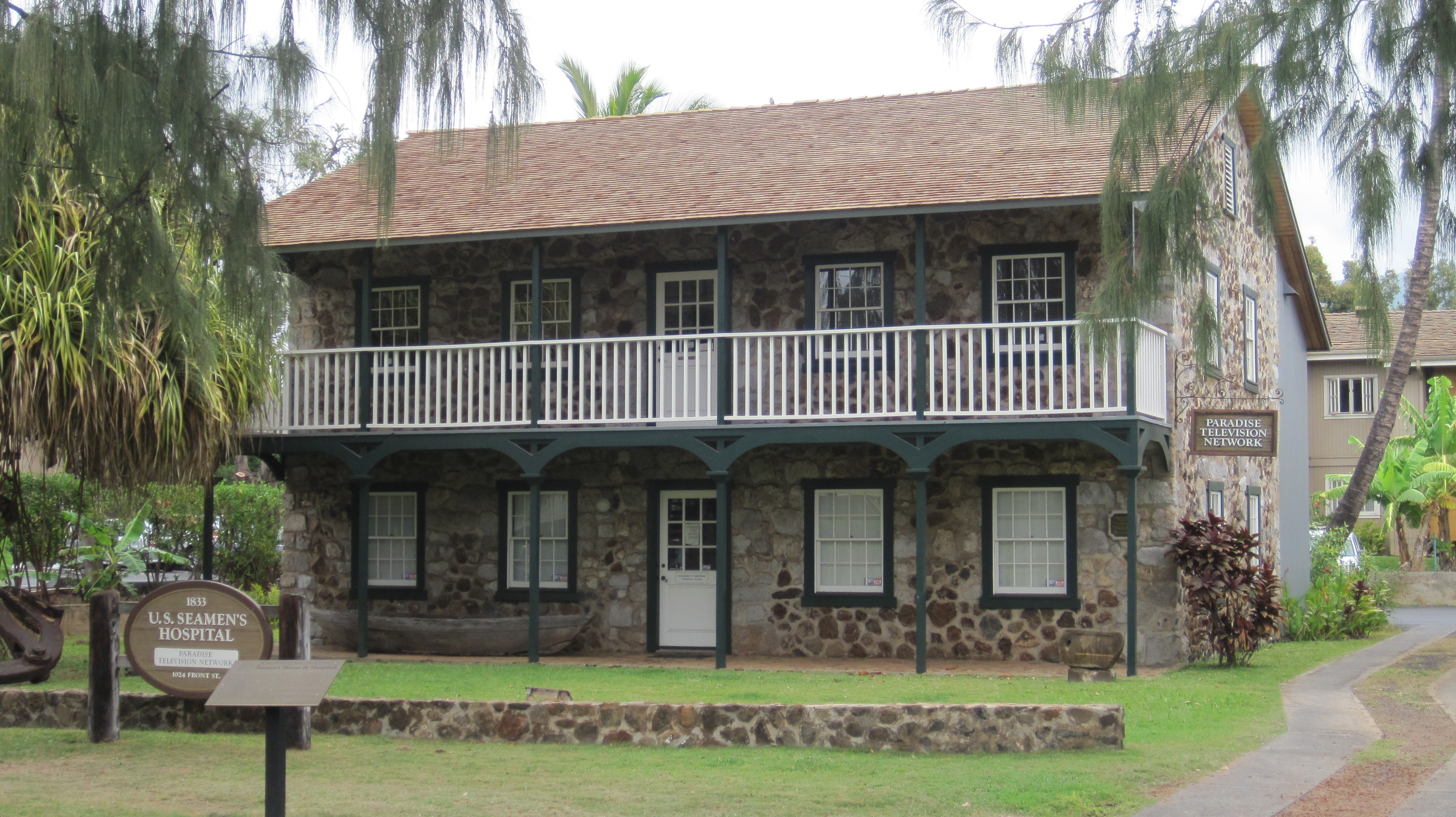
U.S. Seamen's Hospital, 1843

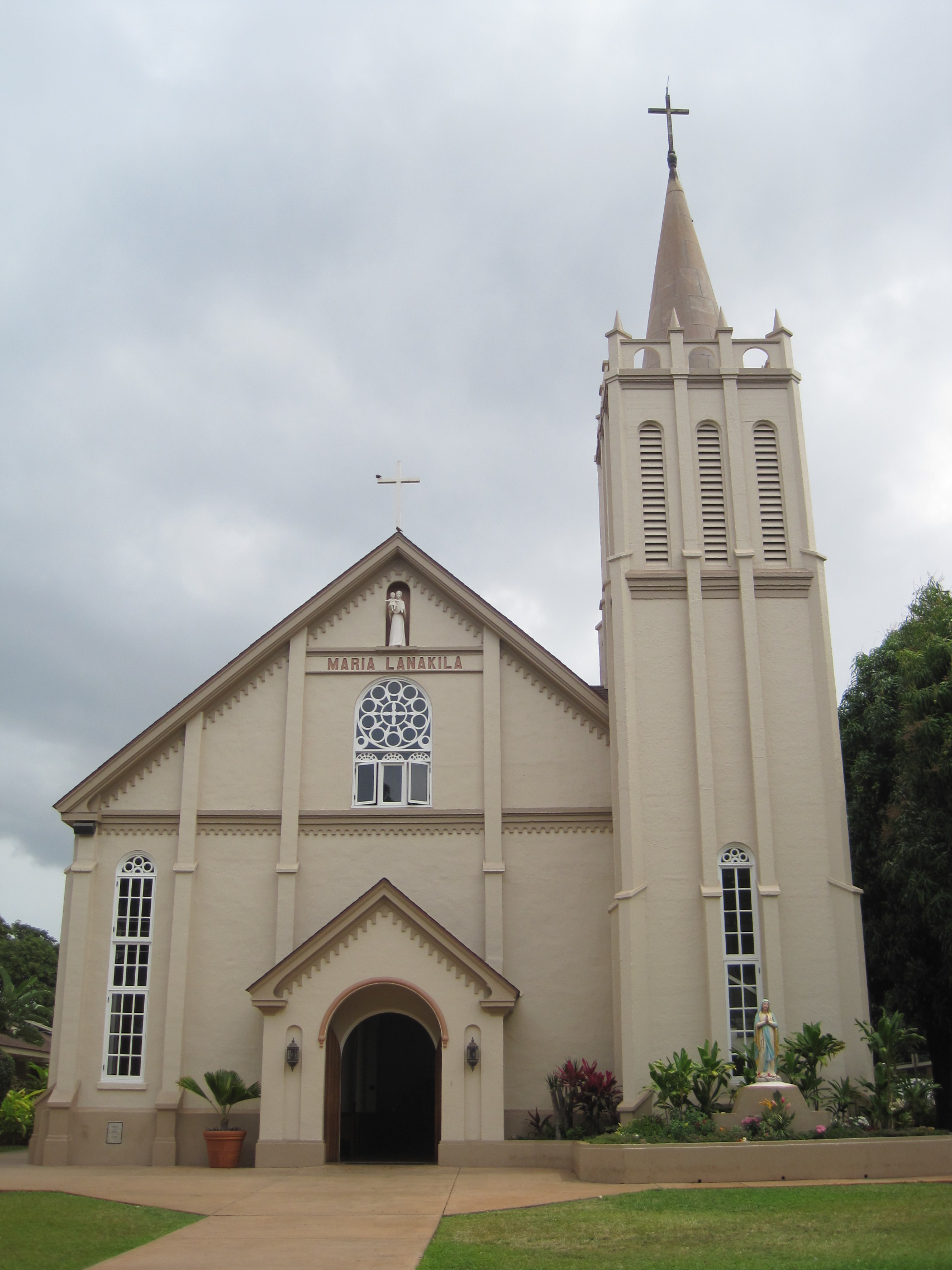
Maria Lanakila Catholic Church, 1858

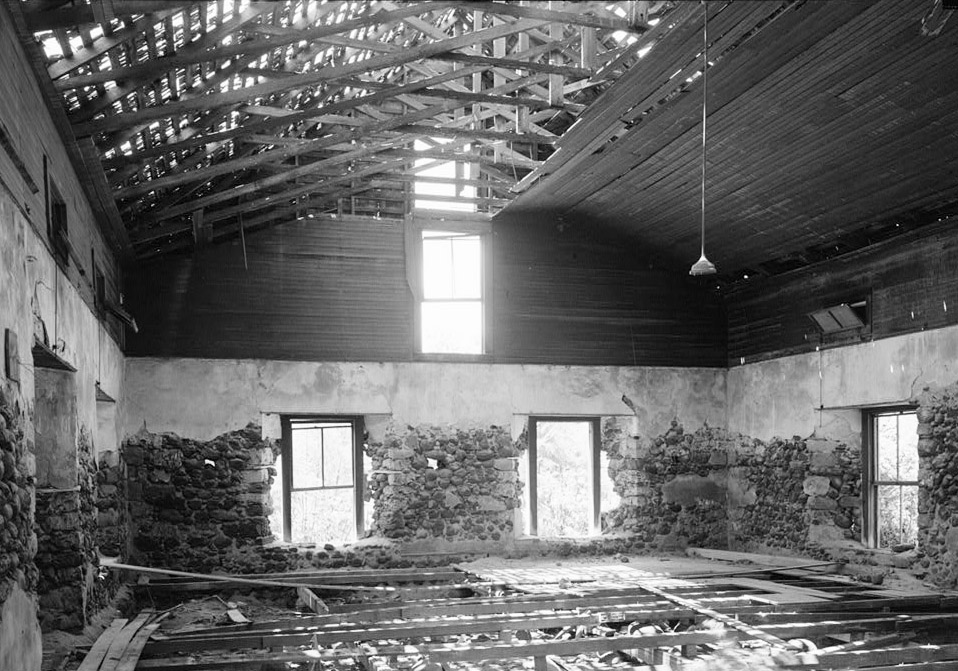
Hale Aloha in 1966, before restoration

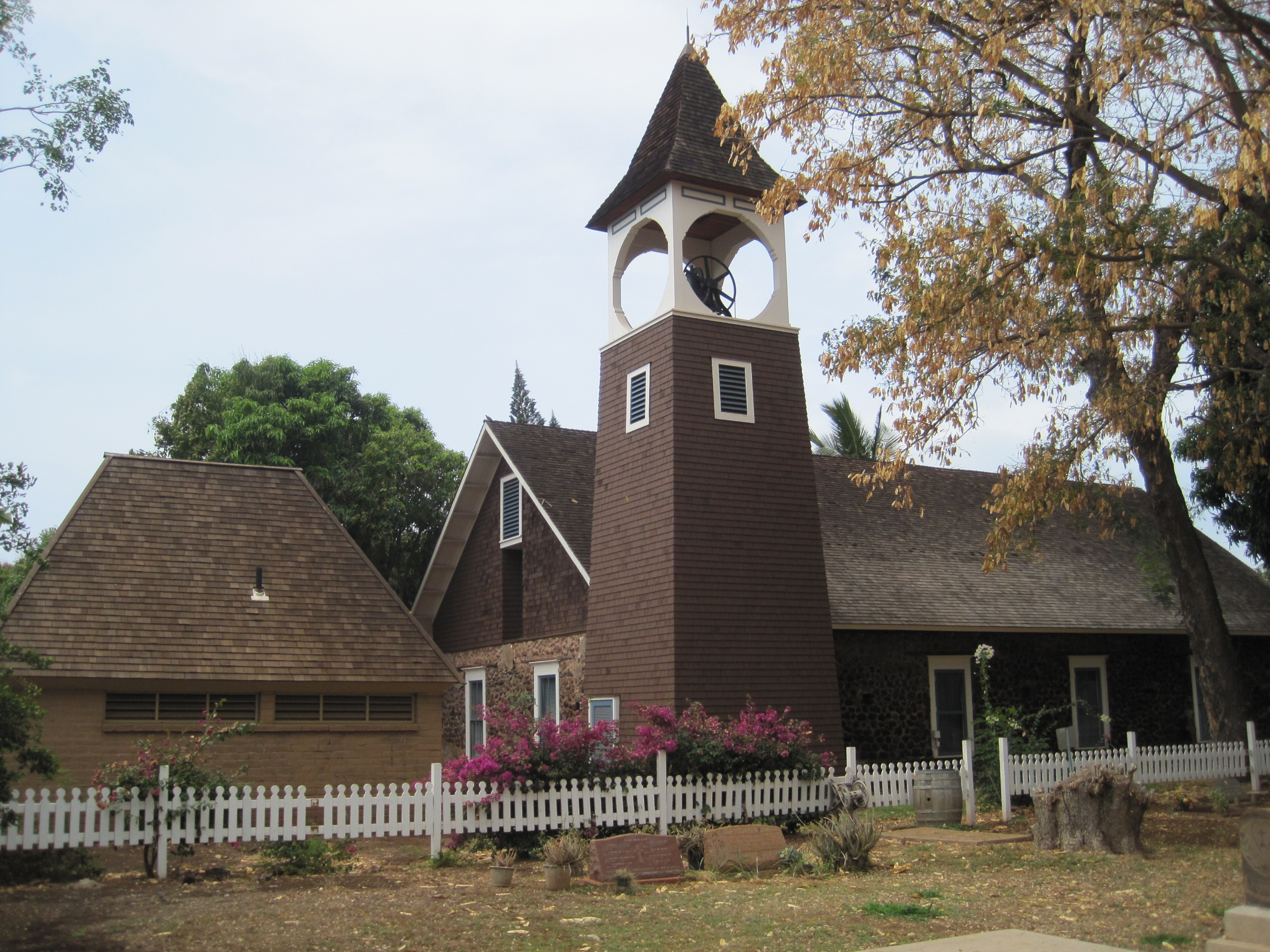
Hale Aloha with bell tower, 1858

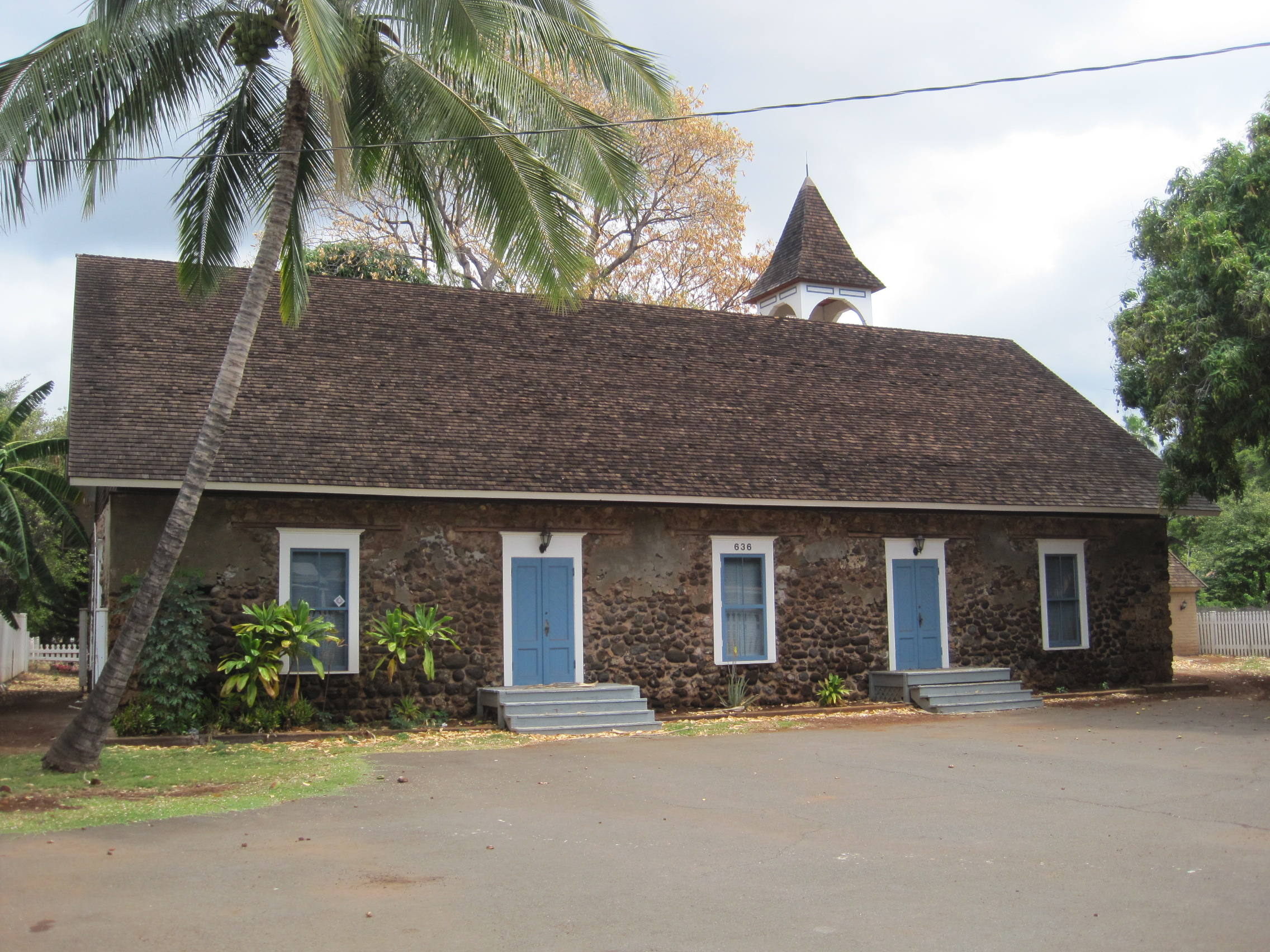
Hale Aloha seaward side, 1858

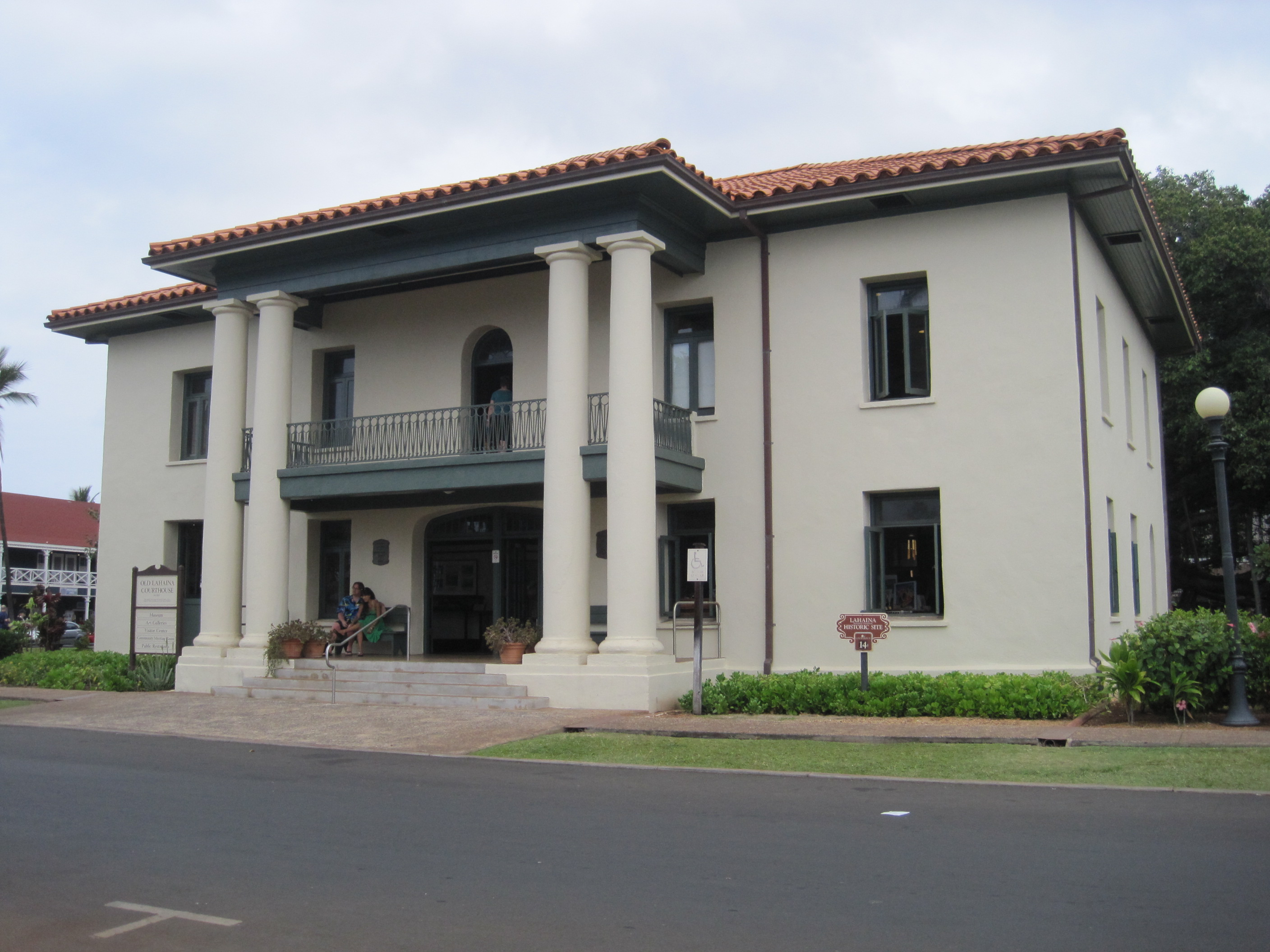
Old Courthouse, 1859

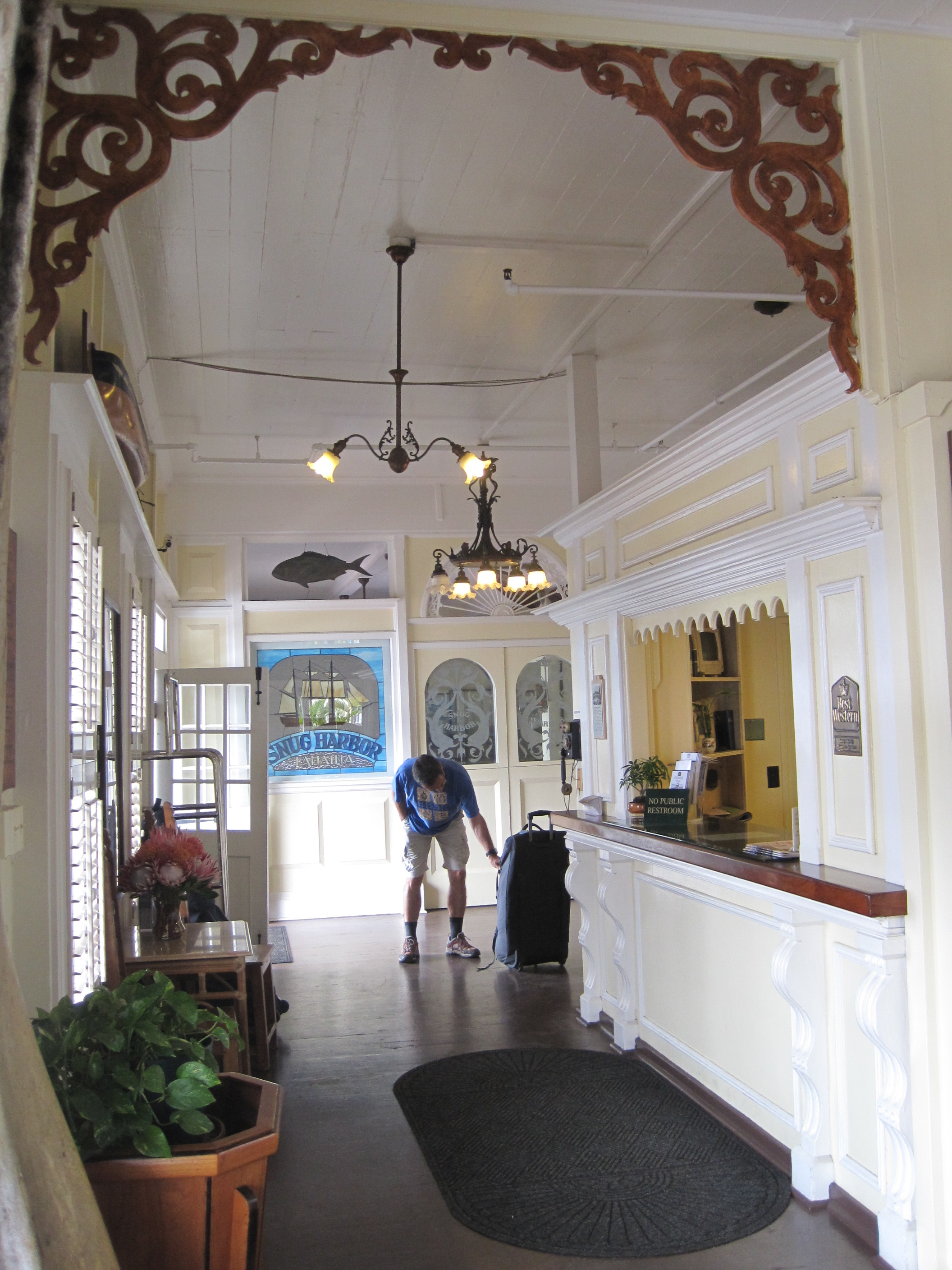
Pioneer Inn front desk, 1901

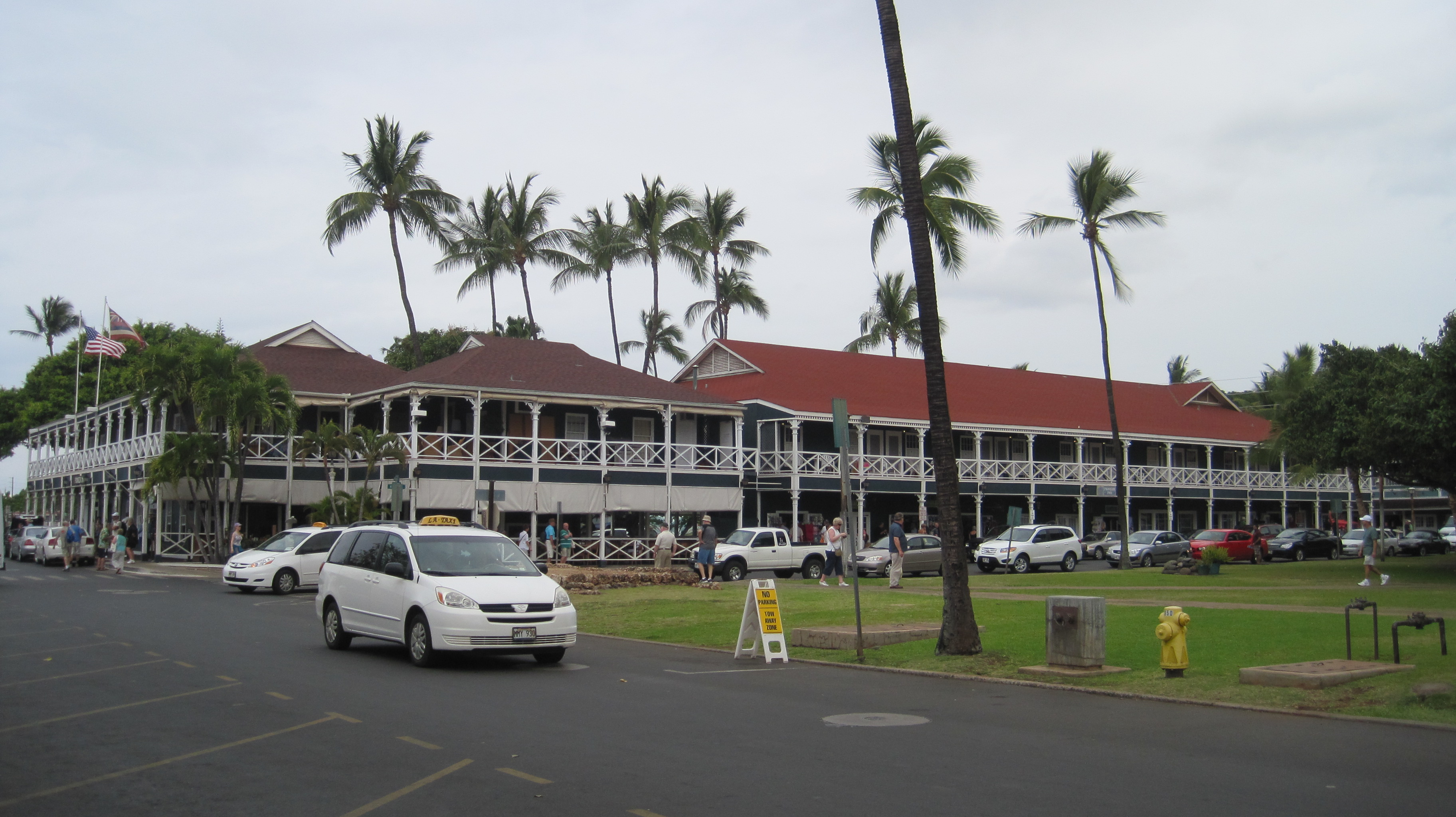
Pioneer Inn, 1901

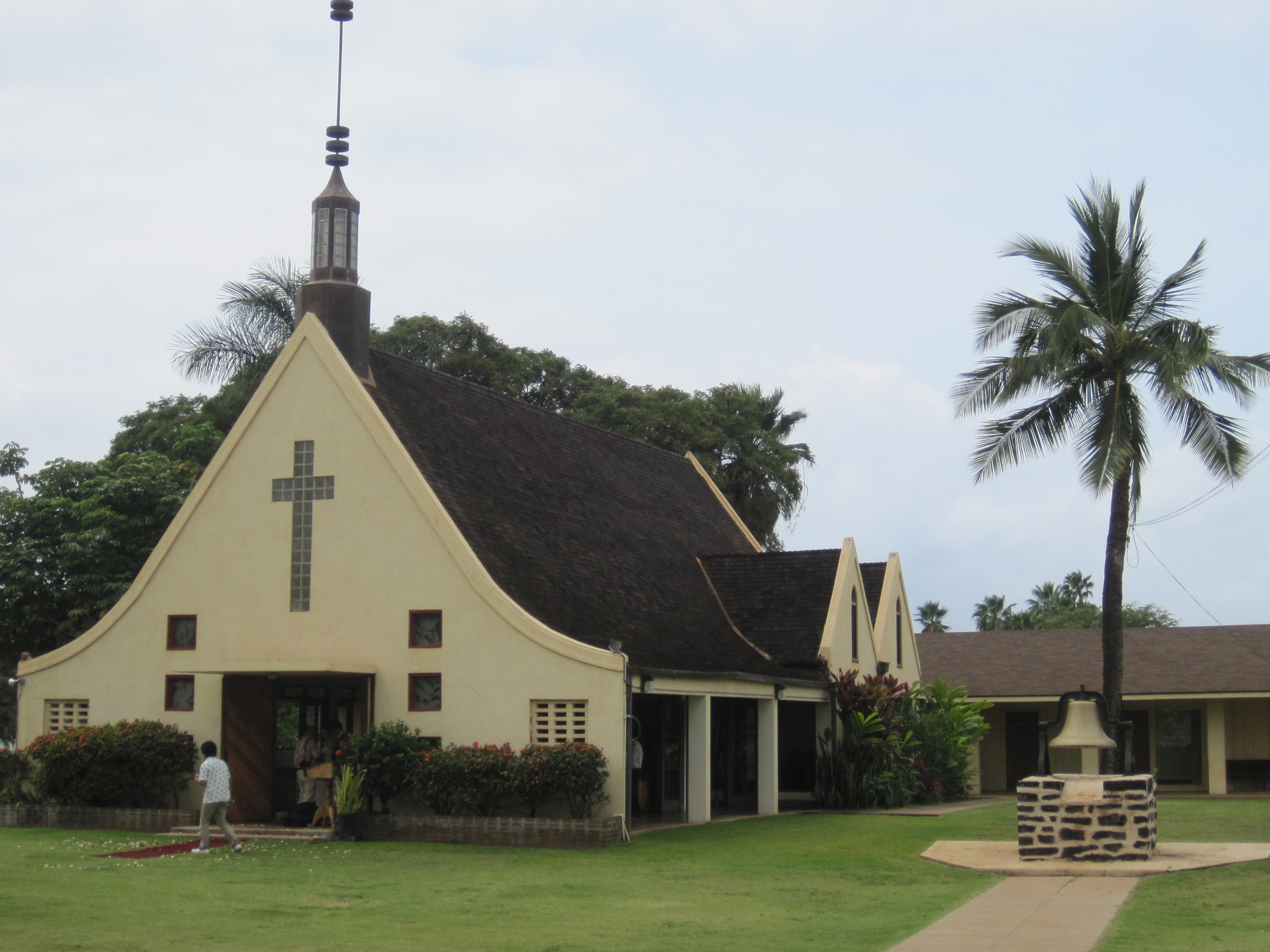
Waiola Church, renamed & rebuilt 1954

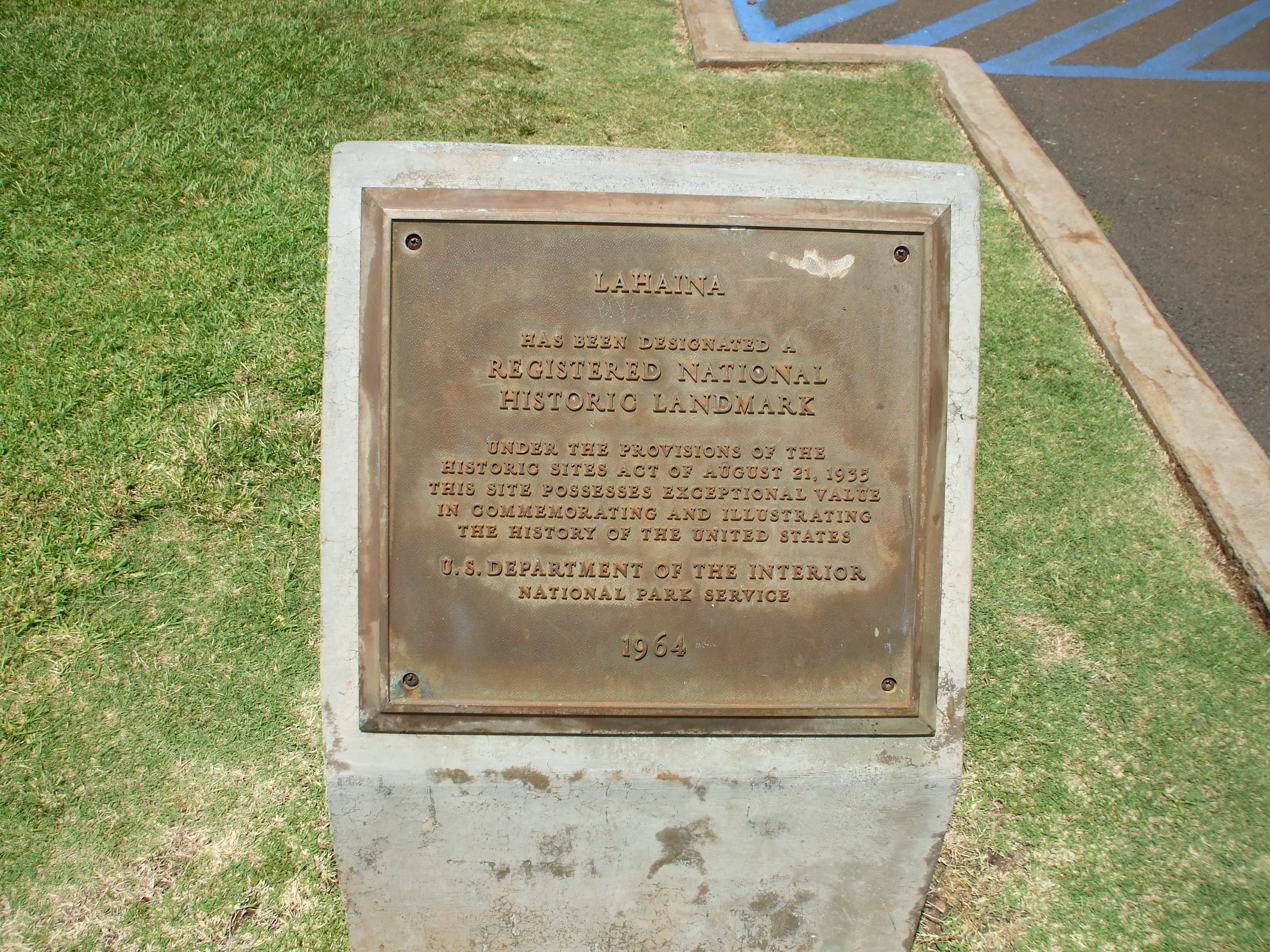
Registered National Historic Landmark plaque, 1964
