= United States Marine Hospital (Lahaina, Hawaii) =

- Lahaina Historic District
- U.S. National Register of Historic Places
- U.S. National Historic Landmark District – Contributing property
- Hawaiʻi Register of Historic Places
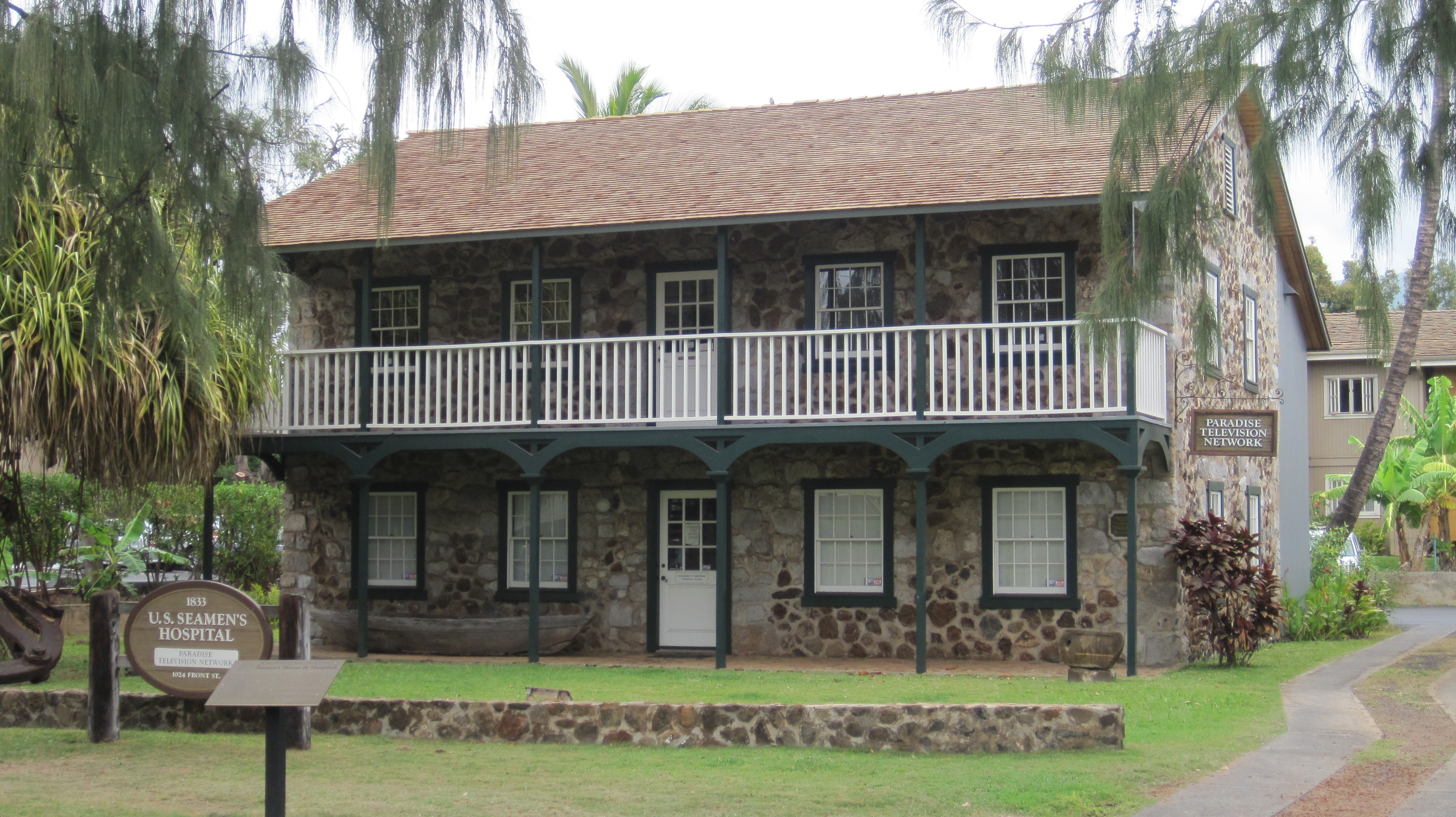
- The building in 2010

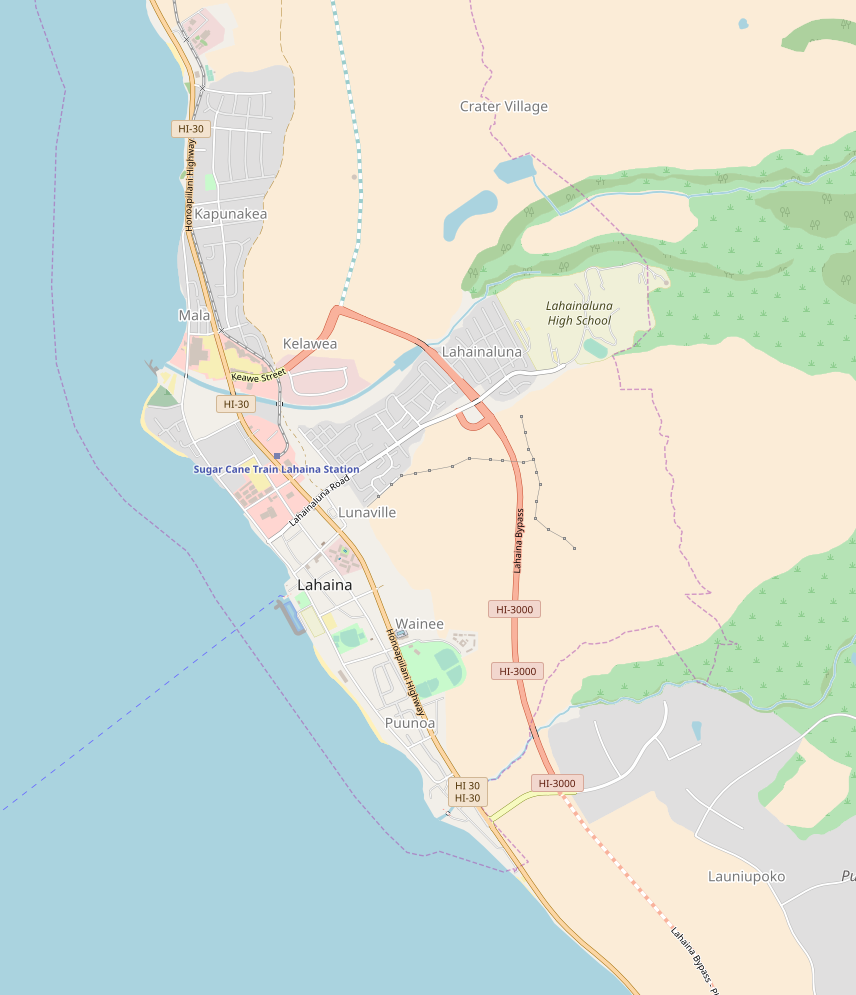
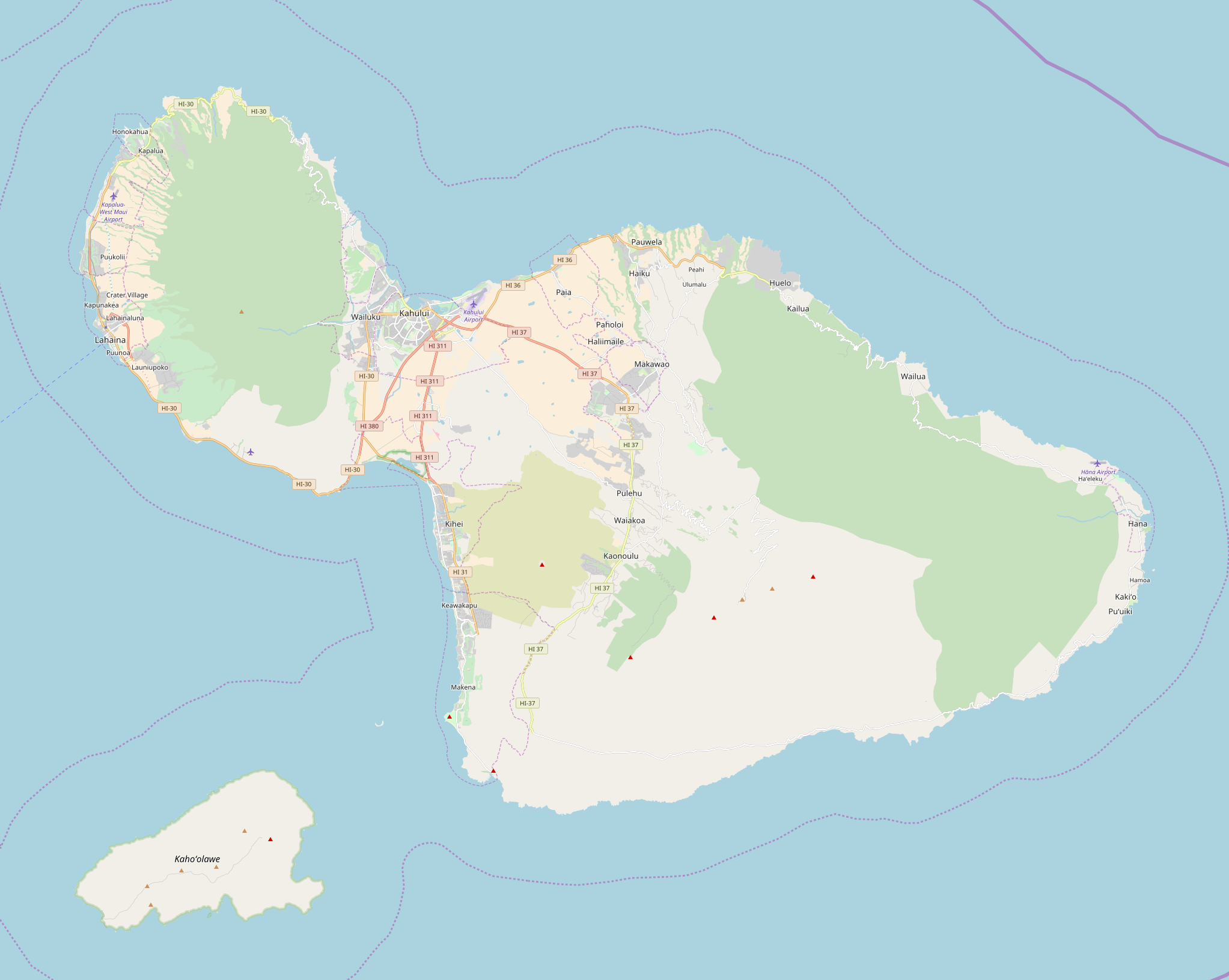
- Location within Lahaina, Hawaii Location within Maui Location within Hawaii
- Location: Front Street, Lahaina, Hawaii
- Coordinates: 20°52′46.7″N 156°40′59.4″W
- NRHP reference No.: 66000302
- HRHP No.: 50-50-03-03001

Significant dates
- Added to NRHP: October 15, 1966
- Designated NHLDCP: December 29, 1962
- Designated HRHP: October 15, 1966

The U.S. Marine Hospital, also known as the U.S. Seamen's Hospital, was one of the earliest remaining buildings in Lahaina, Hawaii. It is listed as a contributing property to the Lahaina Historic District.

The building was constructed in the 1830s as a secret hideaway for King of Hawaii Kamehameha III, and then used as a U.S. Marine Hospital during 1844–1862. Afterwards, it was used by the Anglican Church as a school, and later as a clergy house. It was purchased in 1909 by the Bernice Pauahi Bishop Estate and used as a residence. However, the building deteriorated and was a pile of rubble by 1980. It was restored in 1982 by the Lahaina Restoration Foundation. The building was again destroyed in the 2023 Hawaii wildfires, with only the stone exterior walls remaining.

== History ==
=== Early history ===
The land was granted by King of Hawaii Kamehameha III to Joaquin Armas, a cowboy and immigrant from Alta California, in 1831. The construction of the building on the property was commissioned by the King in 1833 as an inn and store for sailors, and as a remote location for the King to escape the attention of the Christian missionaries. The royal involvement in the building's construction was kept secret. The building additionally held a Chinese store in its early years.

=== Hospital ===
The building was in use as a U.S. Marine Hospital for the benefit of civilian mariners beginning in 1844. At first, Armas leased the building to the U.S. government, but after his death, the property was auctioned off in 1855 to a John Nutter, who immediately resold it to James R. Dow, the physician in charge of the hospital at that time. At the time of its opening, there were no other hospitals in Hawaii. The hospital could accommodate about 60 men, and had three staff. During the boom years of whaling, it had well over a hundred patients each year.

The hospital was closed in 1862 after a U.S. Department of State investigation found widespread graft in the administration of the hospital, including doctors charging fees to the U.S. government for already-dead patients, and also because the whaling industry had declined during the American Civil War.

=== Private use ===
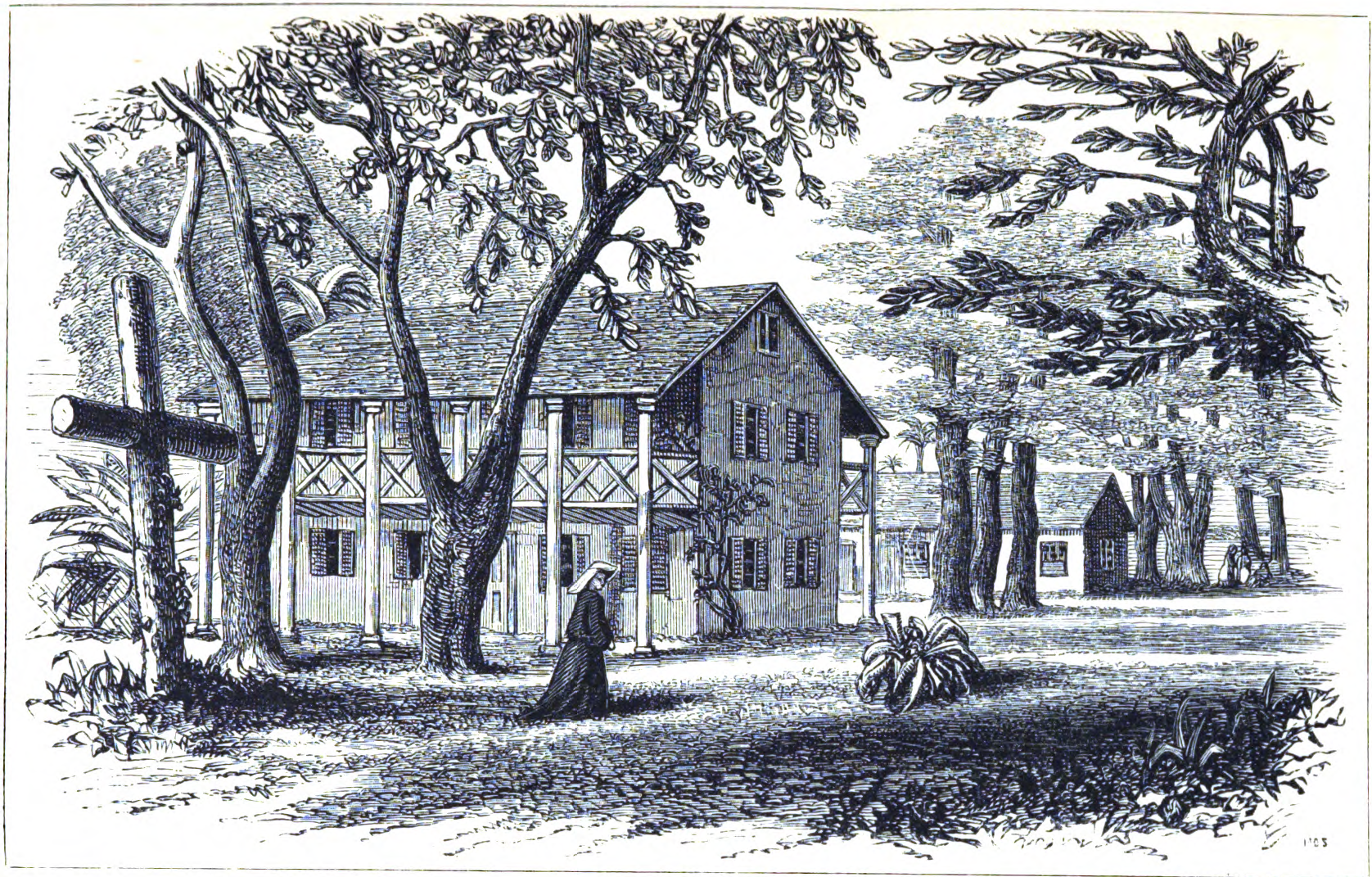
The building in 1868 in use as an Anglican school

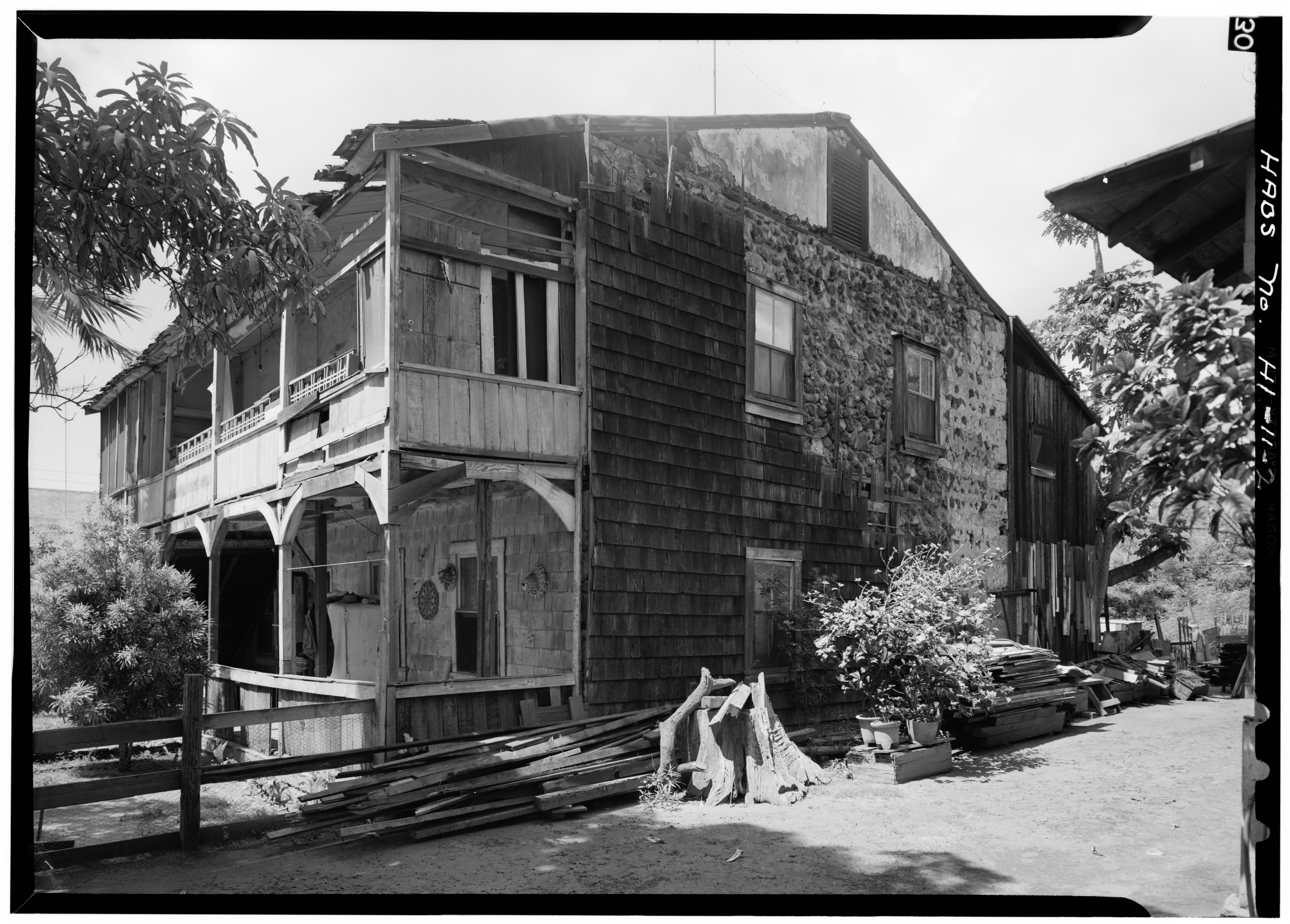
The building in 1966 in use for apartments

In 1865, the Anglican Church in Hawaii leased the property to house the St. Cross School for Girls. After Dow's death, Priscilla Sellon, the Anglican Mother Superior, purchased the property in 1872. The school closed in 1877, and the Anglican Church then purchased the property from Sellon's estate in 1878. It was used for many years as a clergy house for the Anglican ministers, but gradually deteriorated.

It was acquired by the Bernice Pauahi Bishop Estate in 1909 in exchange for another piece of property. In 1962, it was listed as a contributing property to the Lahaina Historic District, and in 1966 it was placed on the National Register of Historic Places in its own right. At the time, it was in use as a tenement residence and was considered in fair condition, although the exterior stone walls had been covered with shingles. Later, it was used as a community meeting hall. However, by 1970 it was considered at risk of disintegration.

=== Restoration ===
The Lahaina Restoration Foundation acquired the building from the Bishop Estate in 1974. At the time, it was described as a ruin. That same year, the Historic Commission approved construction of condominiums surrounding the Marine Hospital. In 1976, two local residents tried to force an environmental impact statement to be made for the condominium construction, but they were unsuccessful because that requirement was only instituted in June 1975, after the Historic Commission approval. Ultimately, vibrations from the condominium construction caused the Marine Hospital's walls to collapse into rubble by 1980.

It was restored by architect Uwe Schulz, who personally funded the restoration in return for a 20-year lease on the property. The restoration was completed in 1982. As of 2023, the Lahaina Restoration Foundation leased out the building for business use.

=== Destruction ===
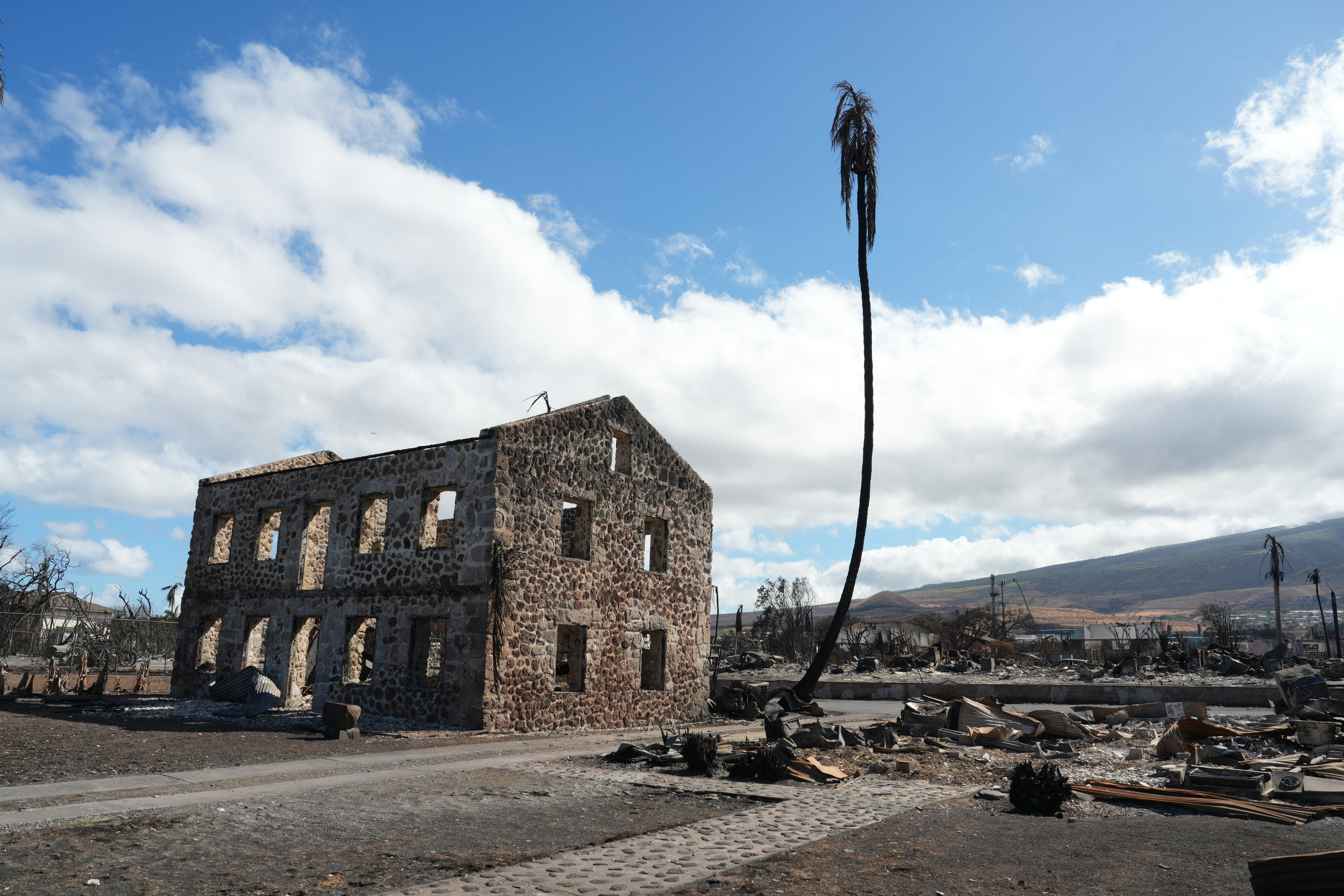
The ruined building in August 2023, just after the Hawaii wildfires

The building's interior was destroyed in the 2023 Hawaii wildfires, with the stone walls remaining standing. In 2024, the Lahaina Restoration Foundation stated that the Marine Hospital was one of at least four historic buildings it was planning to rebuild.
