= Pioneer Inn =

- U.S. Historic district – Contributing property
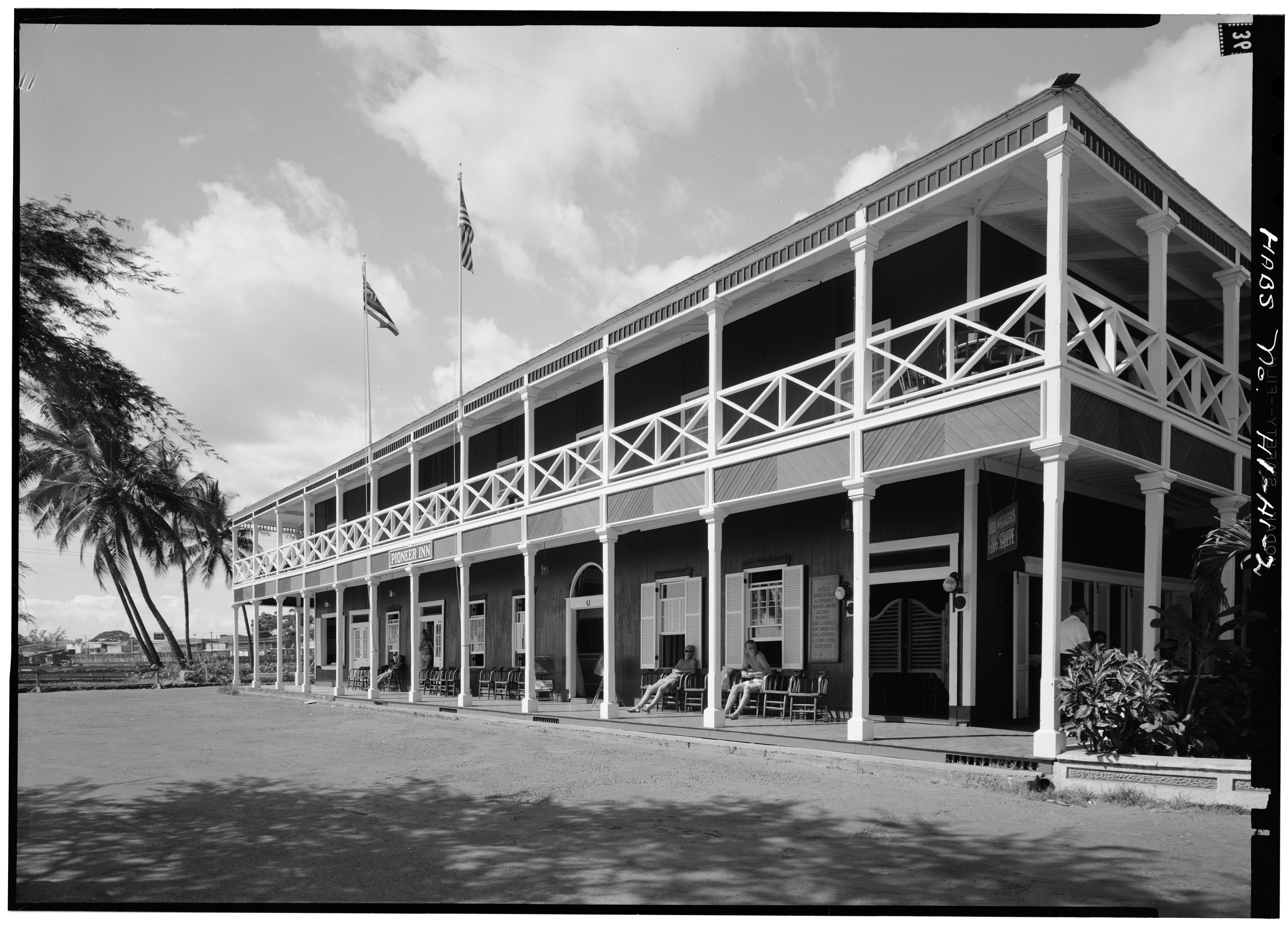

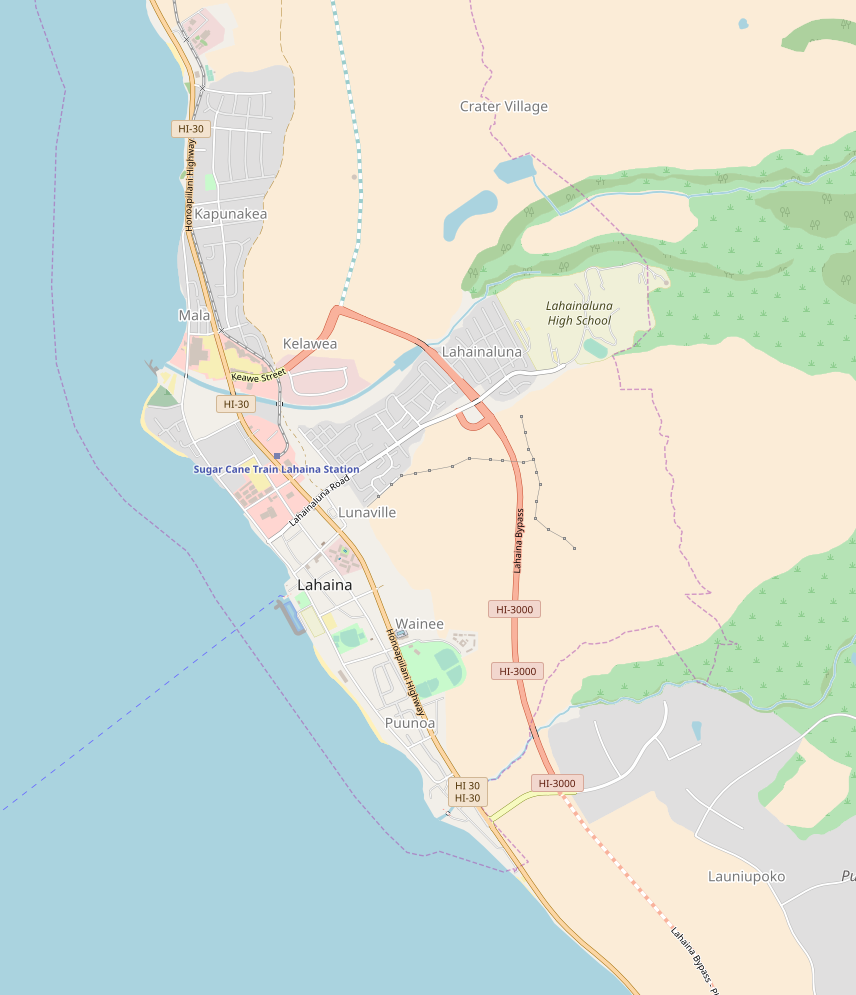
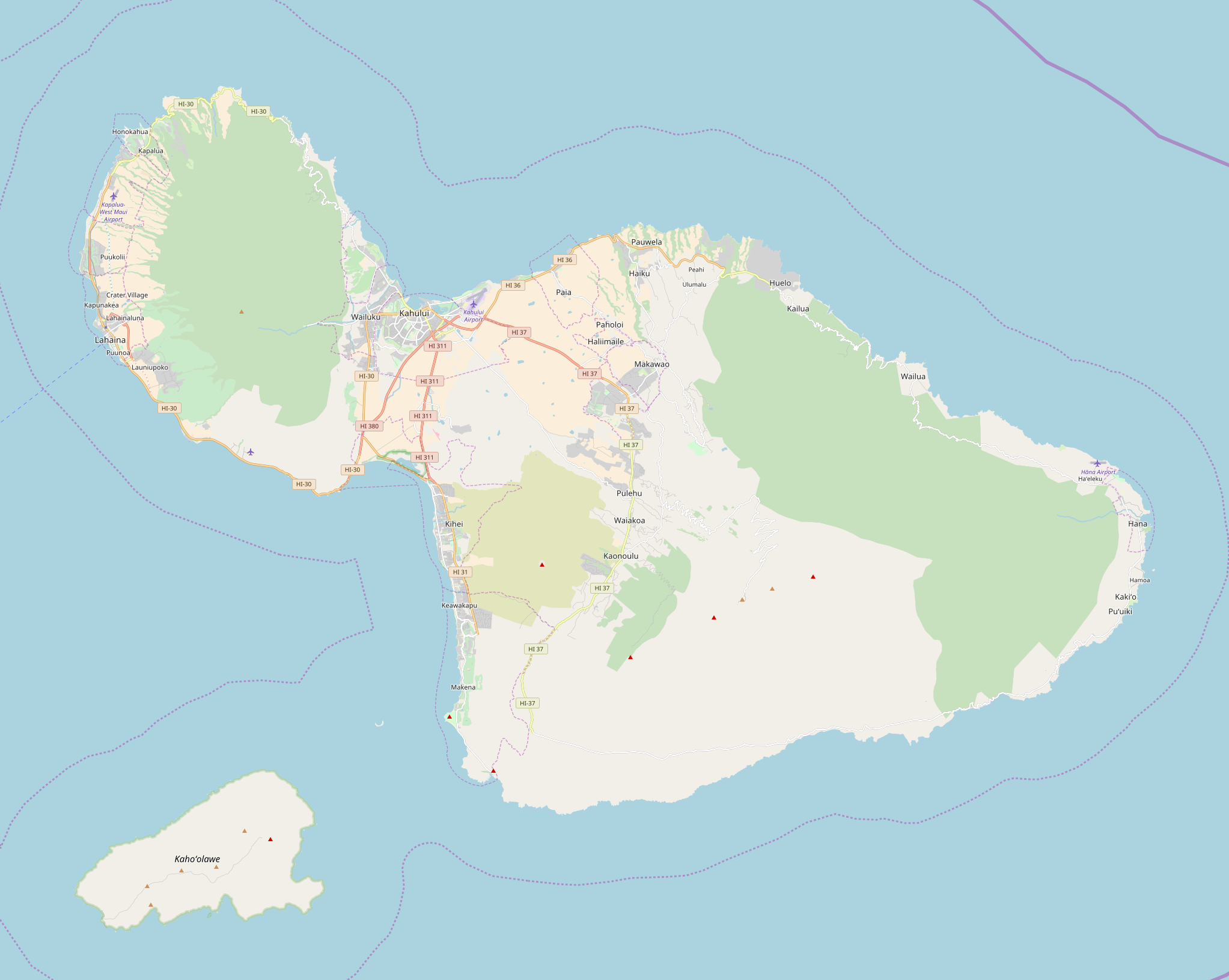
- Location within Lahaina, Hawaii Location within Maui Location within Hawaii
- Location: W side of Maui on HI 30, Lahaina, Hawaii
- Coordinates: 20°52′21″N 156°40′41″W
- Built: 1901
- Demolished: August 9, 2023
- Part of: Lahaina Historic District (ID66000302)
- Designated CP: October 15, 1966

The Pioneer Inn was a 34-room inn in Lahaina, Maui, Hawaii, built in 1901. It was the oldest hotel in Lahaina and on the island of Maui and the oldest in continuous operation in the state of Hawaii. It was a contributing building in the Lahaina Historic District, a U.S. National Historic Landmark, and since 2016 was one of the Historic Hotels of America. It joined Best Western in 1997.

In August 2023, the inn was destroyed by the 2023 Hawaii wildfires.
