= Doherty (surname) =

Doherty (Irish: Dochartaigh) is an Irish surname, which is derived from the O'Doherty clan. It is anglicised from the Gaelic Ó Dochartaigh. Notable people and characters with the surname include:

== List of notable persons with the surname Doherty ==
=== A ===
- Alejandro Doherty (born 1965), Argentinian field hockey player
- Alice Elizabeth Doherty (1887–1933), American woman known for her rare condition of hypertrichosis lanuginosa
- Amina Doherty, Nigerian women's rights advocate
- Anne Doherty (1928–2013), American educator, professor and psychologist
- Arthur Doherty (1932–2003), Irish nationalist politician

=== B ===
- Barbara Doherty (1931–2020), American educator and theologian
- Berlie Doherty (born 1943), English novelist, poet, playwright and screenwriter
- Bernard Doherty (born 1949), English music executive
- Brendan Doherty (born 1959), American police officer and politician
- Brian Doherty (disambiguation), several people

=== C ===
- Carl Doherty (born 1975), New Zealand professional rugby league player
- Carol Doherty (1942–2025), American educator and politician in Massachusetts
- Catherine Doherty (1896–1985), Russian-Canadian social activist
- Charla Doherty (1946–1988), American actress
- Charles Doherty (1855–1931), Canadian politician and jurist
- Charles Wiley Doherty (1855–?), American politician
- Charlie Doherty (1876–1961), Australian rules footballer
- Chris Doherty (born 1965), American musician
- Christopher Doherty (born 1958), American politician
- Claire Doherty, British gallery director
- Colette Doherty (died 2025), Irish poker player
- Con Doherty (1884–1967), Australian rules footballer
- Conor Doherty (born 1990), Irish Gaelic footballer

=== D ===
- Darrien Doherty (born 1971), Australian rugby league footballer
- David Doherty (disambiguation), several people
- Denis Doherty (1861–1935), Australian businessman and politician
- Denny Doherty (1940–2007), Canadian singer
- Diana Doherty, Australian oboist
- Dick Doherty, Irish hurler in the 1910s
- Diona Doherty (born 1989), Northern Irish comedian and actress

=== E ===
- Eamon Doherty (born 1974), Irish League footballer
- Eamonn Doherty, Irish Gaelic footballer
- Earl Doherty (born 1941), Canadian author
- Edward Doherty (disambiguation), several people
- Erin Doherty, British actor
- Eugene Doherty (1862–1937), Irish politician

=== F ===
- Fergal Doherty (born 1981), Irish Gaelic footballer
- Fraser Doherty, Scottish entrepreneur
- Fred Doherty (1887–1961), Canadian professional ice hockey player

=== G ===
- Gary Doherty (born 1980), Irish professional footballer
- Ged Doherty (born 1958), British music industry executive
- George Doherty (1920–1987), American football player
- Gerard Doherty (born 1981), Irish footballer
- Gerard F. Doherty (1928–2020), American politician

=== H ===
- Henry Latham Doherty (1870–1939), Irish-American financier and oilman
- Hugh Doherty (disambiguation), several people

=== I ===
- Ivy Duffy Doherty (1922–2008), Australian-American writer

=== J ===
- Jack Doherty (footballer, born 1915) (1915–1990), Australian rules footballer
- Jack Doherty (footballer, born 1921) (1921–1998), Australian rules footballer
- Jack Doherty (potter) (born 1948), Northern Irish studio potter and author
- Jack Doherty (YouTuber) (born 2003), controversial American YouTuber and Kick streamer
- James Doherty (disambiguation), several people
- Jason Doherty (born 1989), Irish Gaelic footballer
- Jimmy Doherty (farmer) (born 1975), English farmer and television presenter
- Jock Doherty (1894–1957), Australian rules footballer
- Joe Doherty (born 1955), member of the Provisional Irish Republican Army
- Joe Doherty (singer) (born 1970), American punk-rock musician
- John Doherty (disambiguation), several people
- Josh Doherty (born 1996), British footballer

=== K ===
- Katherine Doherty, American actress
- Kathleen A. Doherty, American diplomat
- Katie Doherty (born 1983), English singer-songwriter
- Ken Doherty (born 1969), Irish professional snooker player
- Ken Doherty (track and field) (1905–1996), American decathlon champion
- Kevin Doherty (disambiguation), several people
- Kieran Doherty (hunger striker) (1955–1981), Irish republican hunger striker
- Kieran Doherty (writer), Irish writer and TV format creator

=== L ===
- Lani Doherty (born 1993), American surfer
- Larry Joe Doherty (born 1946), American attorney, judge, and TV show host
- Laurence Doherty (1875–1919), British tennis player
- Lee Doherty (born 1979), English professional footballer
- Len Doherty (1930–1983), British miner, journalist and writer

=== M ===
- Manning Doherty (1875–1938), Canadian farmer, businessman and politician
- Margaret Doherty (born 1951), American politician
- Martin Doherty (born 1982), Scottish musician and producer
- Martin Doherty (Irish republican) (1958–1994), member of the Provisional Irish Republican Army
- Matt Doherty (disambiguation), several people
- Matthew Doherty (disambiguation), several people
- Mel Doherty (1894–1942), American professional football player and coach
- Melissa Doherty (born 1967), Canadian visual artist
- Michael Doherty (disambiguation), several people
- Michelle Doherty, Irish actress and model
- Moya Doherty (born 1957), Irish producer and co-founder of Riverdance

=== N ===
- Neil Doherty (disambiguation), several people
- Noel Doherty (footballer) (1921–2011), Australian rules footballer
- Noel Doherty (loyalist) (1940–2008), Northern Irish loyalist activist

=== P ===
- Paddy Doherty (activist) (1926–2016), Northern Irish activist
- Paddy Doherty (Gaelic footballer) (born 1934), Gaelic footballer
- Paddy Doherty (TV personality) (born 1959), Irish Traveller and bare-knuckle boxer
- Pat Doherty (boxer) (born 1962), English boxer
- Pat Doherty (Northern Ireland politician) (born 1945), Irish politician
- Patrick J. Doherty, United States Air Force general
- Paul Doherty (Gaelic footballer), Irish inter-county goalkeeper for Galway
- Paul C. Doherty (born 1946), English author and educator
- Pearse Doherty (born 1977), Irish politician
- Peter Doherty (disambiguation), several people, including those known as Pete Doherty
- Phil Doherty (born 1951), Australian rules footballer

=== R ===
- Randall Gair Doherty (1937–2002), British schizophrenic, son of Aleister Crowley
- Raymond Doherty, Lord Doherty (born 1958), Scottish lawyer and judge
- Rebecca F. Doherty (born 1952), United States federal judge
- Regina Doherty, Irish politician
- Reginald Doherty (1872–1910), British tennis player
- Richard Doherty (born 1948), British military historian and author
- Richard Doherty (colonialist) (1785–1862), British officer and governor of Sierra Leone
- Robert Doherty (disambiguation), several people
- Ryan Doherty (born 1984), American professional beach volleyball player

=== S ===
- Sarah Doherty (born 1959), American amputee mountaineer, ski racer and motivational speaker
- Seán Doherty (disambiguation), several people
- Shannen Doherty (1971–2024), American actress and producer

=== T ===
- T. A. Doherty (1895–?), Nigerian businessman and politician
- Taylor Doherty (born 1991), Canadian professional ice hockey player
- Thomas Doherty (disambiguation), several people
- Timothy Doherty (born 1950), American Roman Catholic bishop
- Todd Doherty, Canadian politician

=== V ===
- Vin Doherty (1911–1982), Australian rules footballer

=== W ===
- William Doherty (disambiguation), several people
- Wiremu Doherty, New Zealand Māori educator and academic

=== X ===
- Xavier Doherty (born 1982), Australian cricketer

== Fictional characters ==
- Brooke Doherty, police officer in the American TV series Third Watch
- Colm Doherty, in the 2022 film The Banshees of Inisherin
- Jimmy Doherty (Third Watch character), firefighter in the American TV series
- John (Thunderbolt) Doherty, in the 1974 film Thunderbolt and Lightfoot

== See also ==
- Dougherty (surname)
- O'Doherty family
- O'Doherty
- George Doherty Johnston (1832–1910), Confederate officer during the American Civil War
- John Doherty Barbour (1824–1901), Irish industrialist and politician
