= List of Wharton School faculty =

The list of Wharton School faculty includes notable faculty members, professors, and administrators affiliated with the Wharton School at the University of Pennsylvania, located in Philadelphia, Pennsylvania.

== Current faculty ==
=== Administration ===
- Erika H. James - Academic administrator and current dean
- Serguei Netessine - Professor of Innovation and Entrepreneurship, of Operations, Information and Decisions and Vice Dean for Global Initiatives
- Jagmohan S. Raju - Professor of Marketing and Vice Dean, Wharton Executive Education

=== Current faculty ===
- Andrew B. Abel - Professor of the Department of Finance
- J. Scott Armstrong - Author, forecasting and marketing expert and Professor of Marketing
- Janice R. Bellace - Professor Emeritus of Legal Studies & Business Ethics
- Jonah Berger - Associate Professor of Marketing
- Eric T. Bradlow - Professor of Marketing, Statistics, Education and Economics
- Lawton R. Burns - Business theorist, Professor of Management and Chairman of the Health Care Management Department
- T. Tony Cai - Professor of Statistics
- George S. Day - Educator and consultant in the fields of marketing, strategy and innovation management
- Neil A. Doherty - Economist and Frederick H. Ecker Professor Emeritus of Insurance and Risk Management
- Thomas Donaldson - Professor of Ethics and Law
- Peter S. Fader - Professor of Marketing
- Jill Fisch - Professor at the University of Pennsylvania Law School
- Stewart D. Friedman - Professor emeritus and founding director of the Wharton Leadership Program
- Adam Grant - Professor of Psychology
- Herbert Hovenkamp - Professor of Law and Professor of Legal Studies & Business Ethics
- Risa Lavizzo-Mourey - Professor of Health Care Management
- Olivia S. Mitchell - Professor of Business Economics and Public Policy, of Insurance and Risk Management and Executive Director, Pension Research Council
- Mark V. Pauly - Professor of Health Care Management and of Business Economics and Public Policy
- Thomas S. Robertson - Professor of Marketing and Academic Director, Jay H. Baker Retailing Center
- Paul R. Rosenbaum - Professor of Statistics
- Maurice E. Schweitzer - Professor of Operations and Information Management
- Kenneth L. Shropshire - Professor Emeritus, former David W. Hauck Professor and Faculty Director of the Wharton Sports Business Initiative
- Jeremy J. Siegel - Professor of Finance
- Nicolaj Siggelkow - Professor of Management
- Kent Smetters - Professor of Business Economics and Public Policy
- Robert F. Stambaugh - Professor of Finance

== Former faculty ==
- Robert J. Shiller (born 1946), Nobel-Prize winning economist, academic, and author
- Donald B. Keim - Professor of Finance

=== Administration ===
- Thomas P. Gerrity - Former dean and Professor of Management
