= Robert Dougherty =

Robert Dougherty may refer to:

- Robert Dougherty (gridiron football) (born 1972), American gridiron football quarterback
- Bob Dougherty (1932–2006), American football linebacker
- Rob Dougherty (born 1969), professional Magic: The Gathering player
- Robert E. Dougherty, American basketball coach
- Lieutenant Bobby Dougherty, a character played by James Gandolfini in Crimson Tide (1995)

== See also ==
- Robert Doherty (disambiguation)
