= Matt Doherty (footballer, born 1940) =

Northern Ireland footballer (1940–2019)

Matt Doherty Jr.
Personal information
- Date of birth: 1940
- Place of birth: Pennyburn, Derry, Northern Ireland
- Date of death: 16 July 2019 (aged 78–79)
- Place of death: Derry, Northern Ireland
- Position: Inside right

Youth career
- Don Bosco
- Foyle Harps
- 1956–1958: Derry City

Senior career*
Years	Team	Apps	(Gls)
1958–1960	Derry City		
1960–1963	Glentoran		
1963–1970	Derry City		
- * Club domestic league appearances and goals

Matt Doherty Jr. (1940 – 16 July 2019) was a Northern Irish professional footballer who played as an inside right for Derry City and Glentoran.

== Career ==
Doherty played for Don Bosco FC and Foyle Harps Y.F.C. in the Derry and District League before joining Derry City in 1956. He signed a professional contract two years later, in which he made his senior debut in a 2–2 away draw against Glentoran at The Oval. He managed to reach the Irish Cup semi-final with his club in 1959–60, along with his brother Tom during the management of their father Matt Sr., where they lost 1–0 to Ards.

In December 1960, Glentoran paid £2,000, a record transfer fee between Irish League clubs at the time, in order to acquire his services, as he preferred their home turf over other interested clubs. In the 1961–62 Gold Cup semi-final, he netted a hat-trick in a 4–3 win over Coleraine; however, he missed the final due to a car accident on his way to the match. He scored his club's first ever goals in European competitions in a 6–2 away defeat against Real Zaragoza during the 1962–63 Inter-Cities Fairs Cup.

He returned to Derry City under coach Willie Ross for another £2,000 fee. He won the Irish Cup in 1963–64, scoring a goal in a 2–0 victory against his former club Glentoran, followed by the 1964–65 Irish League for the first time in club's history. He played until 1970, retiring at the age of 30.

Doherty also managed to win a "B" international cap for the Northern Ireland national team.

In December 2011, he was included in Derry City's Hall of Fame. He died on 16 July 2019.

== Honours ==
Derry City

- Irish Cup: 1963–64
- Irish Football League: 1964–65
