= List of Penn Quakers men's basketball head coaches =

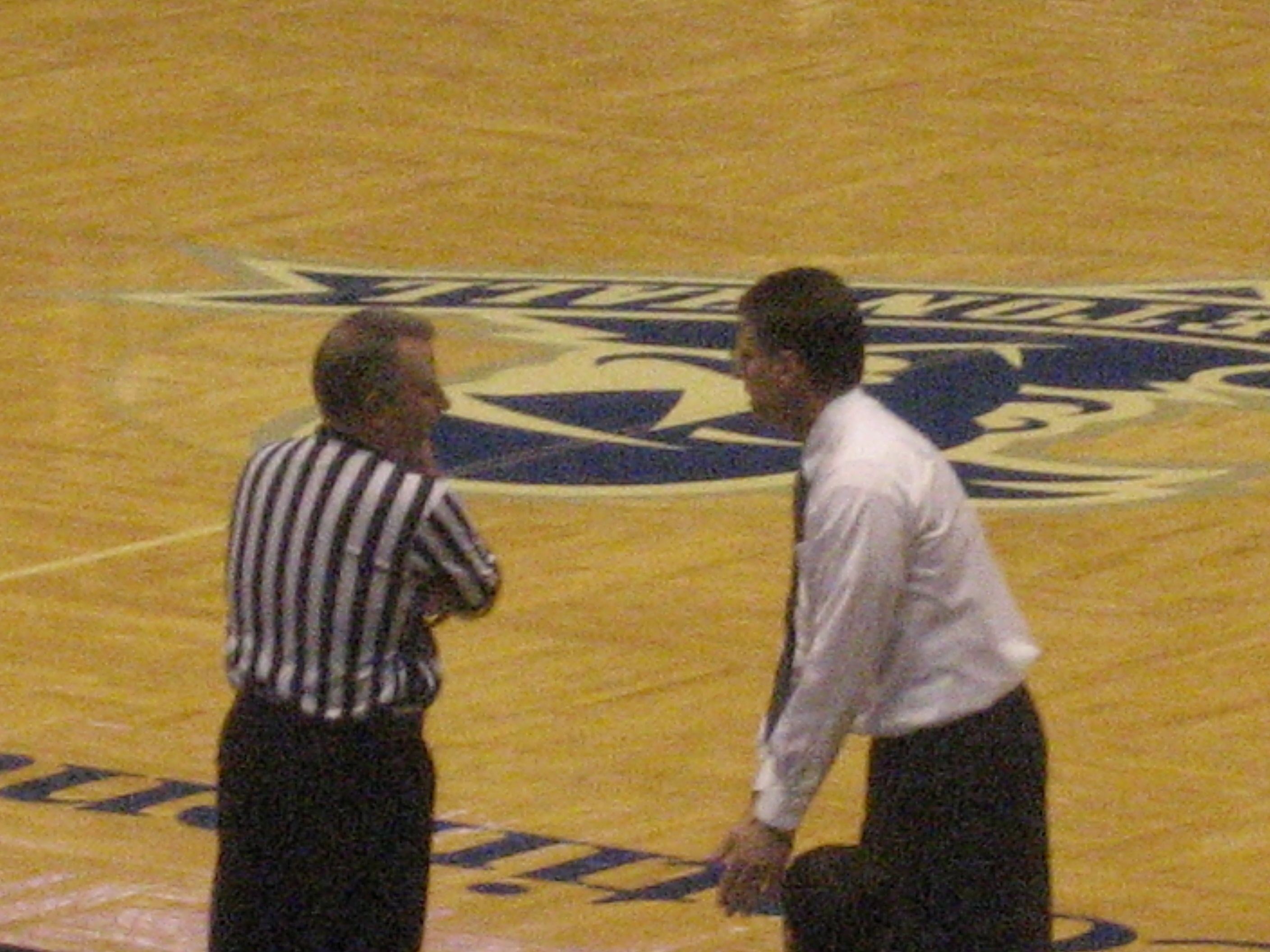
Former coach Glen Miller talks to an official during a game in 2006.

The Penn Quakers men's basketball program is a college basketball team that represents the University of Pennsylvania. The team plays at the Division I level of the National Collegiate Athletic Association (NCAA). They compete in the Ivy League of the NCAA, where they have been since 1897. They play their home games at Palestra in Philadelphia, Pennsylvania, named after palaestra, the ancient Greek wrestling school.

The men's team has had 20 official head coaches in its history. The team has played in 3,066 games over 124 seasons of collegiate play from the 1896–97 season to the 2016–17 season (excluding 1897 to 1901, when the Quakers did not play due to low attendance and lack of interest), compiling a record of 1867–1198–1 (.609).

For the first five years they played, the team had no coach. Russell Smith became the first head coach for the team in 1905. In Smith's four seasons as head coach, the team went 74–22–0 (.771), the best winning record out of any of the coaches in team history. The team made their first NCAA tournament appearance in 1953, under Howard Dallmar. 17 years later, Dick Harter was the next coach to bring the team to an NCAA Tournament bid. Under coaches Chuck Daly (1971–1977) and Bob Weinhauer (1977–1982), the team made nine tournament bids in 11 years, including an appearance in the Final Four. Fran Dunphy (1989–2006) compiled the most conference and overall wins as head coach with 310 wins and 191 wins, respectively. He also has the most NCAA Tournament appearances out of any head coach (10), but in nine of those appearances, the team was knocked out in the first round. Steve Donahue was named as head coach in 2015. In his tenure as head coach, the team won the 2018 Ivy League Championship and the 2019 Big 5 Championship and compiled a record of 131-130–0 (.500). On March 27, 2025, Fran McCaffery was named head coach and in the 2025-2026 season, the team compiled a 18-12 record, the 2026 Ivy League Tournament Championship and the first NCAA tournament appearance since 2018.

== List of coaches ==
		Overall		Conference		
Name	Years	Won–Lost	Pct.	Won–Lost	Pct.	Note
No coach	1897; 1902–05	33–28–2	.540	7–11	.389	
R. B. Smith	1905–09	73–22	.768	23–5	.821	2× EIL Champs
Charles "Kid" Keinath	1909–12	36–25	.590	11–7	.611	
Arthur Kiefaber	1912–14	10–24	.294	5–13	.278	
Lon Jourdet	1914–20; 1930–43	227–143	.614	105–86	.550	6× EIL Champs
Edward McNichol	1920–30	186–63	.747	62–40	.608	3× EIL Champs
Donald Kellett	1943–45; 1946–48	46–31	.597	23–15	.605	1945 EIL Champs
Robert E. Dougherty	1945–46	7–10	.412	4–4	.500	
Howard Dallmar	1948–54	105–51	.673	48–26	.649	1953 EIL Champs
Ray Stanley	1954–56	31–19	.620	19–10	.655	1955 Ivy League Champs
Jack McCloskey	1956–66	146–105	.582	87–53	.621	1966 Ivy League Champs, 1× Big 5 Champs
Dick Harter	1966–71	88–44	.667	49–21	.700	2× Ivy League Champs, 2× Big 5 Champs
Chuck Daly	1971–77	125–38	.767	74–10	.881	4× Ivy League Champs, 4× Big 5 Champs
Bob Weinhauer	1977–82	99–45	.688	62–9	.873	5× Ivy League Champs, 2× Big 5 Champs
Craig Littlepage	1982–85	40–39	.506	28–14	.667	1985 Ivy League Champs
Tom Schneider	1985–89	51–54	.486	36–20	.643	1987 Ivy League Champs
Fran Dunphy	1989–06	310–163	.655	191–49	.796	10× Ivy League Champs, 3× Big 5 Champs
Glen Miller	2006–09	45–52	.412	27–15	.643	2007 Ivy League Champs
Jerome Allen	2009–2015	65–104	.384	38–46	.452	
Steve Donahue	2015–2025	131–130	.502	63–63	.500	2018 Ivy League Champs, 2019 Big 5 Champs
Fran McCaffery	2025–present	18–12	.600	9-5	.643	2026 Ivy Tournament Champs
