= Noel Doherty =

Noel Doherty may refer to:

- Noel Doherty (footballer) (1921–2011), Australian rules footballer
- Noel Doherty (loyalist) (1940–2008), Northern Irish loyalist activist
