= Broom Bezzums =

German folk music duo

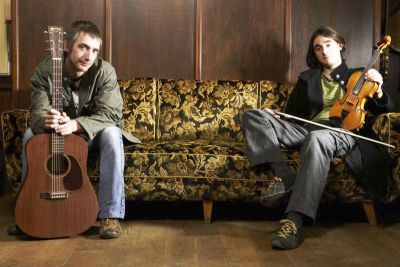
- Broom Bezzums, 2008

Background information
- Origin: Rhineland-Palatinate, Germany
- Genres: Roots; folk; acoustic
- Instruments: Vocals; mandolin; fiddle; guitar; northumbrian pipes
- Years active: 2005–present
- Label: Steeplejack Music
- Members: Andrew Cadie; Mark Bloomer
- Website: broombezzums.com

Broom Bezzums is a folk music duo formed in Germany in October 2005, by Mark Bloomer and Andrew Cadie.

Before starting Broom Bezzums, Bloomer was the original drummer in the band Babylon Zoo. As the band formed, Cadie had just graduated from the University of Newcastle upon Tyne with a BMus (Hons) in Folk and Traditional Music. The duo have released five studio albums on the German Steeplejack label.

== History ==
Bloomer and Cadie initially performed in the Rhineland-Palatinate region of Germany where each of them had settled before a chance meeting at an Irish music session in Kirchheimbolanden. Less than a year after forming, they were invited to play at the Tanz und Folk Festival in Rudolstadt.

Later that year they signed to Steeplejack Music and started work on their first album, Arise You Sons of Freedom, which was released in August 2007. While recording their third album, Wine From a Mug, the duo invited Andrew's friend and fellow Folk Degree graduate Katie Doherty to sing guest vocals on two songs. This marked the beginning of an ongoing, intermittent collaboration of the duo with Doherty both in the studio and on stage.

August 2016 saw the UK release of No Smaller Than the World, which was released in Germany the previous October, and was awarded with the German Record Critics’ Prize in the Bestenliste 1–2016, which offers "an honest guide to new releases of true artistic significance."

Following the UK release of the album, the BBC's Gaelic language station Radio nan Gàidheal's "Caithream Ciuil" programme made No Smaller Than the World Clàr na Seachdain – or record of the week. It was also made 'Album of the Month' by reviews website Folkwords. One track on the album, an original song by Andrew Cadie, was recorded by folk artists Show of Hands and released on their 2015 album The Long Way Home. This pre-dates Broom Bezzums‘ own recorded version of the song. Keep Hauling was recorded again by Cornish shanty band Fisherman's Friends and used on the soundtrack of the film of the same name.

UK Folk Festival performances have been relatively rare, but notable appearances were at Glasgow's Celtic Connections in 2009, Ely Folk Festival in 2012, Abbotsbury in 2013 and Warwick Folk Festival in 2014.

== Discography ==
- 2007: Arise You Sons of Freedom (Steeplejack Music)
- 2008: Under the Rug (Steeplejack Music)
- 2011: Wine from a Mug (Steeplejack Music)
- 2012: Winterman (Steeplejack Music)
- 2013: Round the Houses (EP) (Steeplejack Music)
- 2015: No Smaller Than the World (Steeplejack Music)
- 2018: Winterman (Bonus Edition) (Steeplejack Music)
- 2025: Standing Strong (Feel Your Way Music)
