= Neil Doherty =

Neil Doherty may refer to:

- Neil Doherty (footballer) (born 2001), English footballer
- Neil Doherty (radio presenter) (fl. 2010s), Irish radio presenter
- Neil A. Doherty, American economist
- Neil Doherty, founding member of the band, The Tannahill Weavers
- Neil Doherty, a priest in the sexual abuse scandal in the Archdiocese of Miami
