= William Doherty (disambiguation) =

William Doherty (1857–1901) was an American entomologist.

William Doherty may also refer to:

- William Doherty (priest) (fl. 1869–1922), Archdeacon of Perth in the Diocese of Huron, Anglican Church of Canada
- Billy Doherty (born 1958), drummer for Northern Ireland band The Undertones
- Will Doherty, American activist and executive
- William David Doherty (1893–1966), English-born rugby international for Ireland and surgeon
- William H. Doherty (1907–2000), American electrical engineer
- Willie Doherty (born 1959), Northern Irish photographer and video artist
- William C. Doherty (1902–1987), American labor union leader and ambassador
