= Rose Tribe =

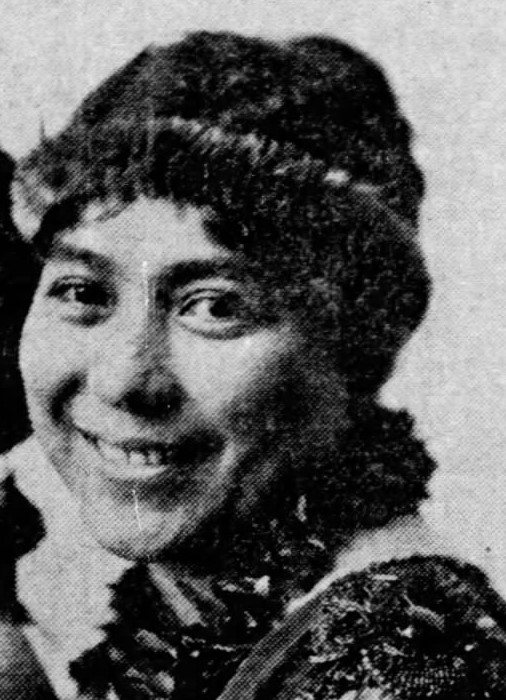
- Rose Tribe in 1927

Background information
- Born: Rose Kalamahaaheo Otis; July 15, 1890; Lahaina, Maui, Kingdom of Hawaii
- Died: February 18, 1934 (aged 43) Honolulu, Oahu, Territory of Hawaii
- Occupations: Hand maiden to Liliʻuokalani; Soprano soloist
- Instrument: Ukulele
- Years active: c.1917–1934
- Labels: Columbia

Rose Kalamahaaheo Otis Tribe Tyson (July 15, 1890 – February 18, 1934) was a soprano soloist in the Territory of Hawaii, and was a protégée of Queen Liliʻuokalani.

== Early life ==
She was born of Hawaiian ancestry in Lahaina, Maui, Kingdom of Hawaii, and was primarily known as a soprano soloist. A graduate of Kamehameha School for girls, she was hand maiden to Queen Liliʻuokalani and traveled with the queen's retinue. She was positioned as the royal musical protégée, groomed by the queen herself to convey Liliʻuokalani's compositions in the manner in which they were originally composed. In 1915, she married Leopold W. Tribe.

== Professional career ==
After Liliʻuokalani's death, she began performing publicly as a soloist, accompanying herself on the ukulele, eventually becoming known as "the soprano with the million dollar smile". She was a popular featured soloist on radio stations KGMB and KGU.

Tribe worked off and on with composer Charles E. King, who had also been a musical protogée of Liliʻuokalani's. She was cast in his Hawaiian-language opera The Prince of Hawaii. At its May 4, 1925 premiere, Tribe appeared as Queen Kamaka, with Joseph Kamakau as King Kalani and Ray Kinney in the lead of Prince Kauikalu.

She was sent to Portland, Oregon as part of the Honolulu Ad Club representatives to draw delegates to a 1928 convention in Honolulu. Singing the Charles Alphin composition "What Aloha Means", she received a standing ovation from the estimated 800 delegates in the audience.

== Later life and death ==
On April 15, 1932, Tribe married KGU announcer Homer N. Tyson. Afterward, she was professionally referred to as both Rose Tribe and Rose Tribe Tyson. She died on February 18, 1934, from complications of a stroke.

In later decades, Hawaiian opera tenor Charles K.L. Davis attributed much of his repertoire to a songbook once owned by Tribe.

== Discography ==
Tribe recorded four songs for Columbia Records

Singles

- "Old Plantation:
- "What Aloha Means"
- "Ku'u Home"
- "Pauoa Liko Lehua"
