= James Doherty =

James Doherty may refer to:

- James Doherty (actor) (born 1966), English actor
- Jim Doherty (footballer) (1958–2024), Scottish footballer
- Jim Doherty (musician) (born 1939), Irish jazz pianist
- Jim Doherty (shooter), Irish clay pigeon shooter
- Jimmy Doherty (born 1975), English farmer and television presenter
- Jimmy Doherty (Third Watch character), fictional firefighter in the American TV series

== See also ==
- James Edward O'Doherty (1848–1932), Irish lawyer and politician
- Jim O'Doherty, American television producer, writer and actor
- James Dougherty (disambiguation)
