= 1959–60 Irish Cup =

Tournament details
- Country: Northern Ireland
- Teams: 16

Final positions
- Champions: Linfield (27th win)
- Runners-up: Ards

Tournament statistics
- Matches played: 18
- Goals scored: 85 (4.72 per match)

The 1959–60 Irish Cup was the 80th edition of the Irish Cup, the premier knock-out cup competition in Northern Irish football.

Linfield won the cup for the 27th time, defeating Ards 5–1 in the final at The Oval.

The holders Glenavon were eliminated in the quarter-finals by Linfield.

== Results ==
=== First round ===
Team 1	Score	Team 2
Ards	8–0	Dundela
Cliftonville	2–2	Ballymena United
Coleraine	0–2	Glenavon
Derry City	2–2	RUC
Distillery	4–1	Bangor
Glentoran	3–1	Ballyclare Comrades
Linfield	3–1	Portadown
Portadown Reserves	2–1	Crusaders

==== Replay ====
Team 1	Score	Team 2
Ballymena United	4–0	Cliftonville
RUC	1–3	Derry City

=== Quarter-finals ===
Team 1	Score	Team 2
Distillery	5–3	Ballymena United
Glentoran	1–1	Derry City
Linfield	5–3	Glenavon
Portadown Reserves	2–4	Ards

==== Replay ====
Team 1	Score	Team 2
Derry City	3–2	Glentoran

=== Semi-finals ===
Team 1	Score	Team 2
Ards	1–0	Derry City
Linfield	5–2	Distillery

=== Final ===
30 April 1960

Linfield	5–1	Ards
Ferguson 22', 76'; Gough 24'; Milburn 53', 75'	Report	Welsh 27'

The Oval, Belfast
Attendance: 17,000
