= Maui =

Second largest island in Hawaii

Nickname: The Valley Isle
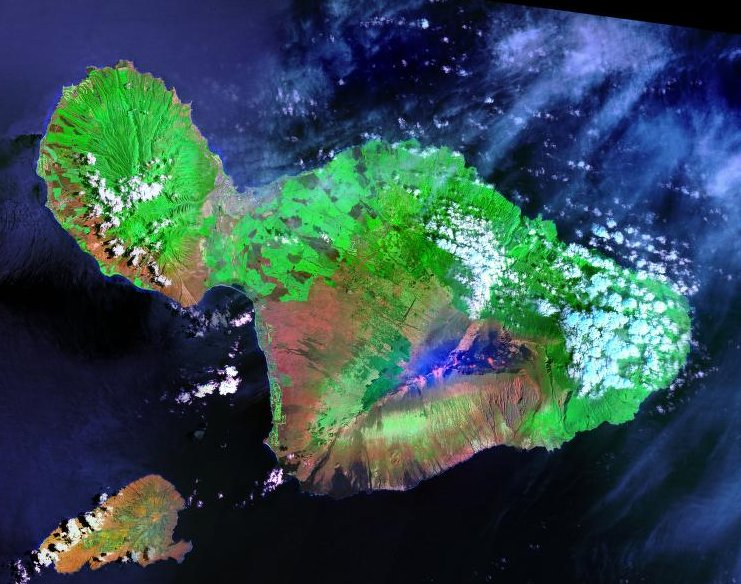
- Landsat satellite image of Maui. The small island to the southwest is Kahoʻolawe.

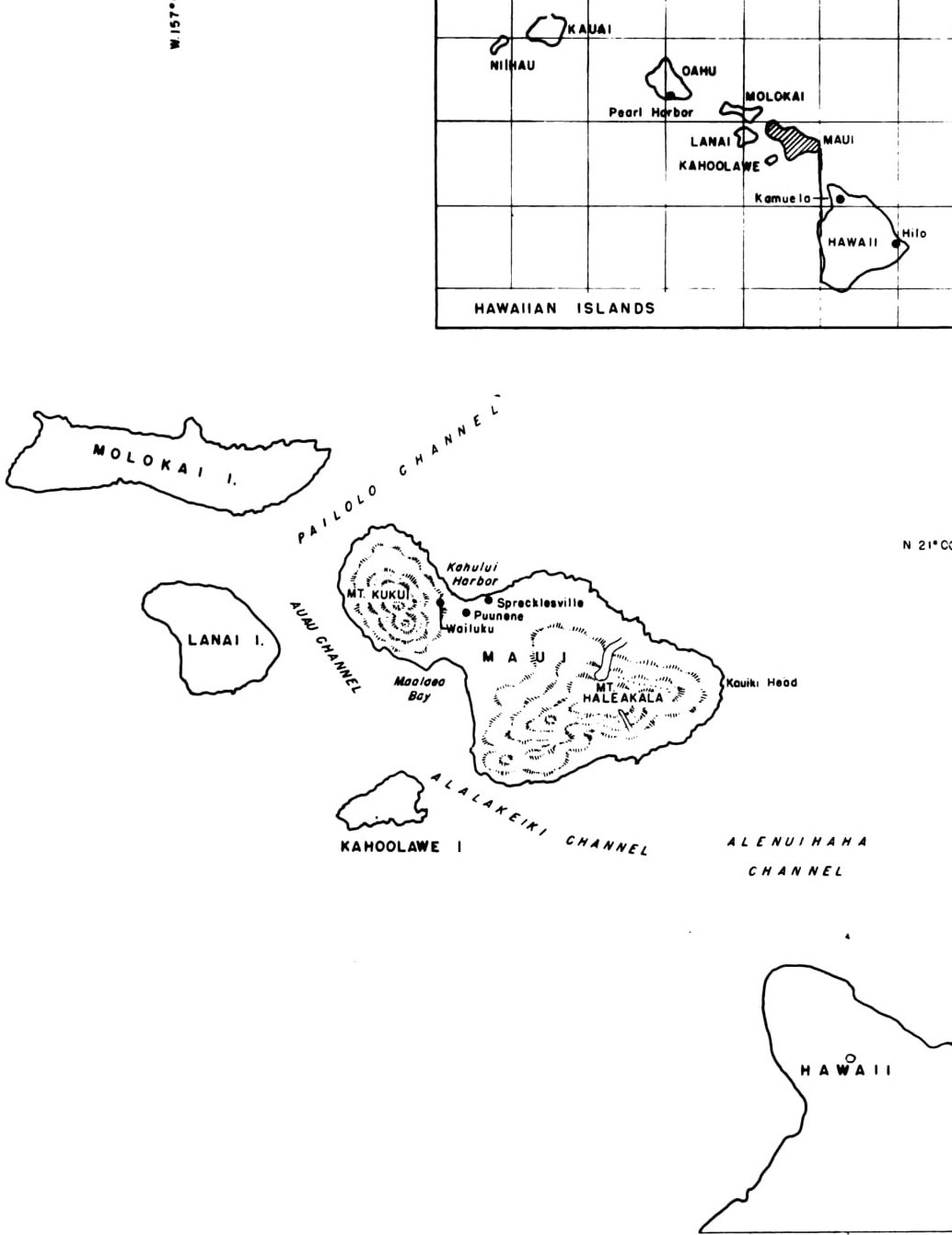
- Small-scale map of the island and location in the state of Hawaii Location of Maui in Hawaii

Geography
- Location: 20°48′N 156°18′W
- Area: 727.2 sq mi (1,883 km^{2})
- Area rank: 2nd largest Hawaiian island
- Highest elevation: 10,023 ft (3055 m)
- Highest point: Haleakalā

Administration
- United States
- Symbols
- Flower: Lokelani
- Color: ʻĀkala (pink)
- Largest settlement: Kahului

Demographics
- Demonym: Mauian
- Population: 164,221 (2021)
- Pop. density: 162/sq mi (62.5/km^{2})

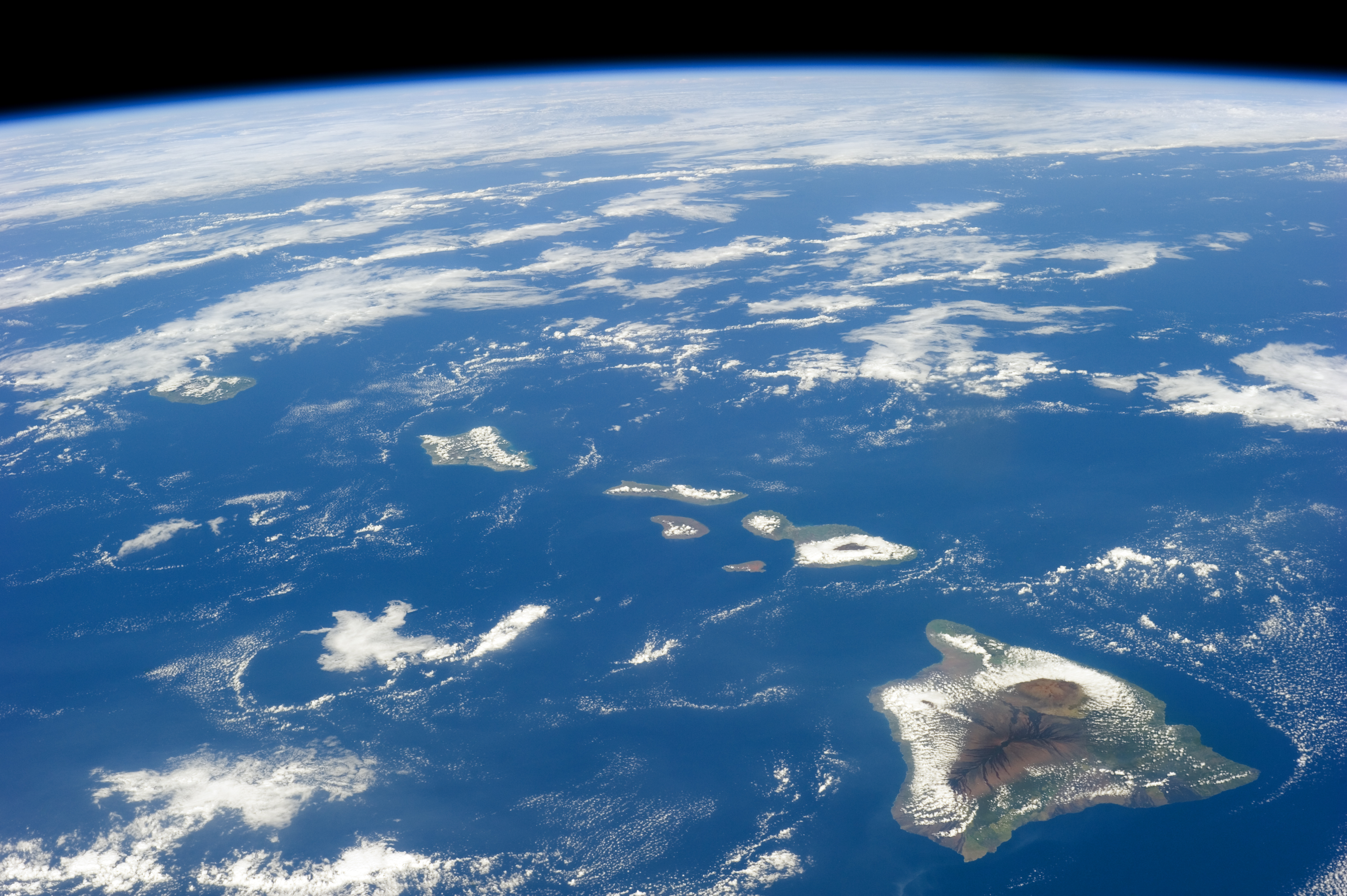
Maui (center right, with Molokaʻi, Lānaʻi, and Kahoʻolawe to its left) as seen from the International Space Station

Maui (Note: /ˈmaʊi/; Hawaiian pronunciation: [ˈmɐwwi].) is the second-largest island in the Hawaiian archipelago, at 727.2 square miles (1,883 km^{2}). It is the 17th-largest in the United States. Maui is one of Maui County's four sizable islands, along with Molokaʻi, Lānaʻi, and Kahoʻolawe.

In 2020, Maui had a population of 168,307, the third-highest of the Hawaiian Islands, behind Oʻahu and Hawaiʻi Island. Kahului is the largest census-designated place (CDP) on the island, with a 2020 population of 28,219. It is Maui's commercial and financial hub. Wailuku is the county seat and was the third-largest CDP as of 2010. Other significant populated areas include Kīhei (including Wailea and Makena in the Kihei Town CDP), Lāhainā (including Kāʻanapali and Kapalua in the Lāhainā Town CDP), and Upcountry Maui (including Makawao, Pukalani, Kula, and Ulupalakua), although Lāhainā was mostly destroyed by fire in 2023.

Once part of Maui Nui, Maui is dominated by two volcanic features: Haleakalā in the southeast, and the West Maui Mountains in the northwest. The two are connected by an isthmus about six miles wide that gives the island its nickname, the Valley Isle.

Maui has a significant tourism industry, with nearly three million visitors in 2022. A 2023 report based on 2017 data concluded that nearly 40% of Maui County's economy was tourism-related. Popular tourist destinations include the resorts in the Kāʻanapali, Kapalua, and Kihei/Wailea/Makena areas; Hāna and the Hana Highway; ʻĪao Valley; Haleakalā National Park; and its many beaches.

== Etymology ==
Native Hawaiian tradition gives the origin of the island's name in the legend of Hawaiʻiloa, the navigator credited with discovering the Hawaiian Islands. According to that tradition, Hawaiʻiloa named the island after his son, who in turn was named for the demigod Māui. Maui's previous name was ʻIhikapalaumaewa. Maui Island is also called the "Valley Isle" for the large isthmus connecting its northwestern and southeastern volcanic masses.

== Geology ==
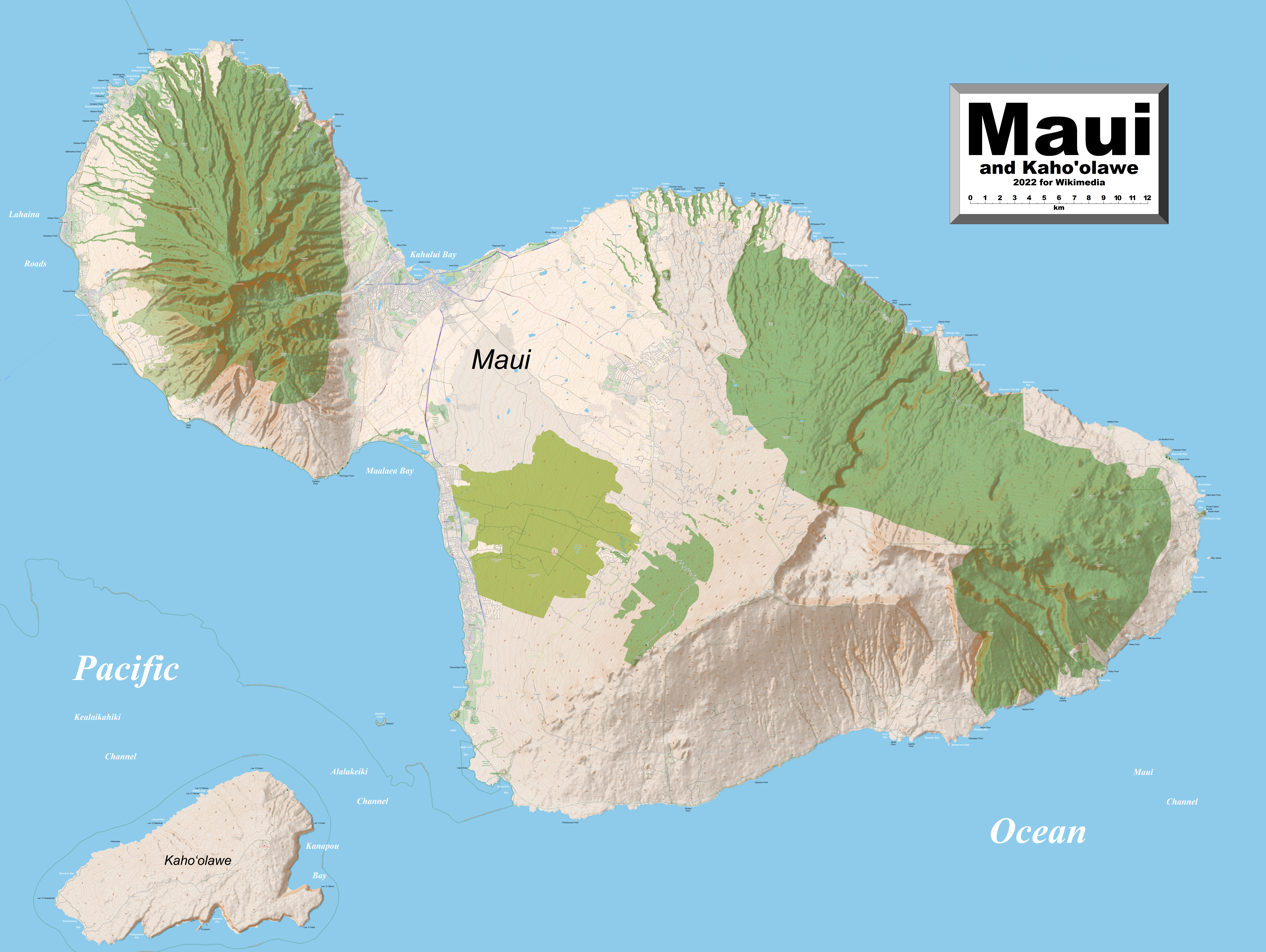
Map of Maui and Kahoʻolawe

Like all other Hawaiian Islands, Maui was formed from the volcanism associated with the Hawaii hotspot.

The islands' volcanic cones are formed from basalt, a dark, iron-rich/silica-poor rock, which poured out of thousands of vents as fluid lava over millions of years. Some of its volcanoes were close enough to each other that lava flows on their flanks overlapped, merging into a single island. Maui is one such "volcanic doublet," formed from two shield volcanoes that overlapped to form Maui.

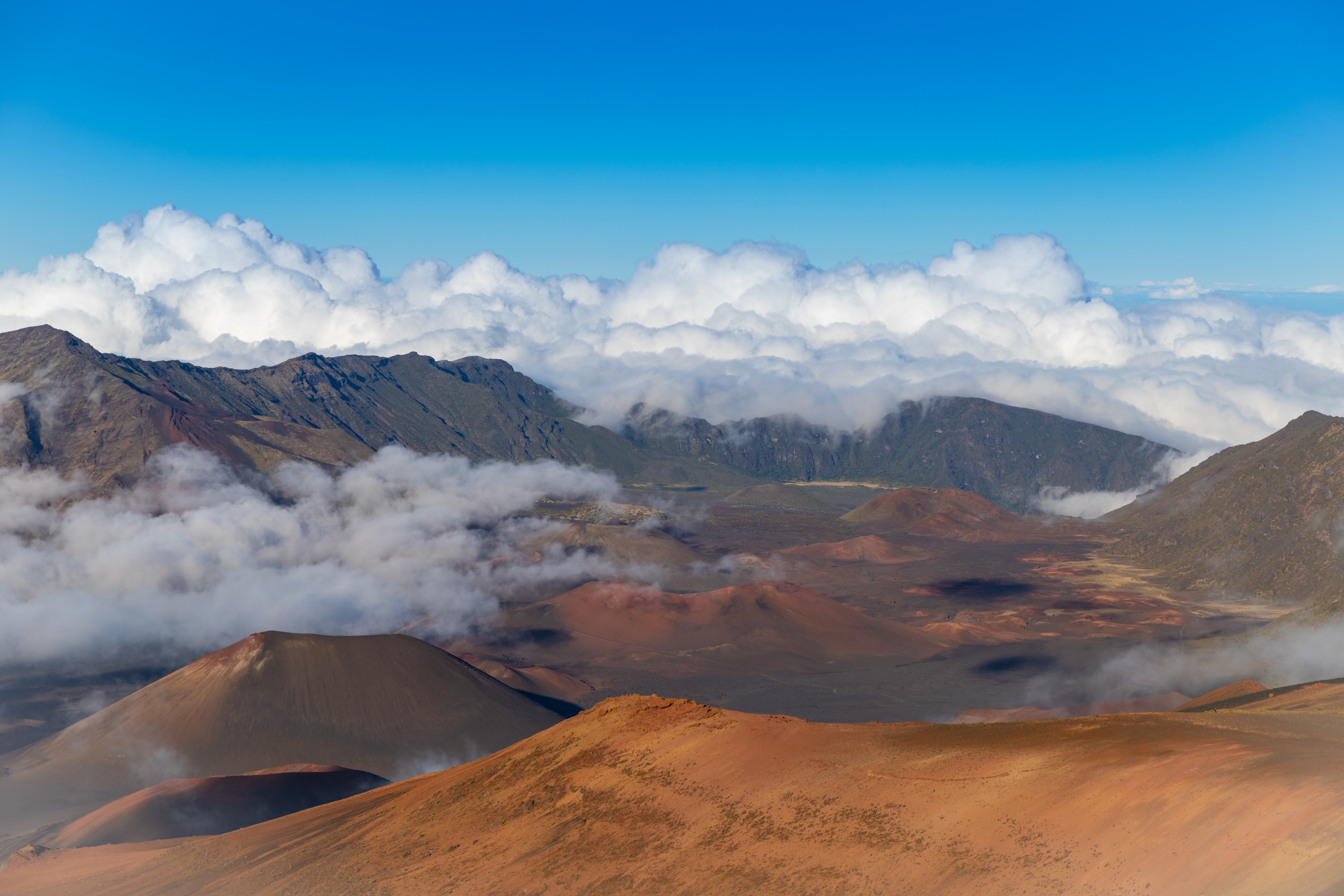
Looking into the Haleakalā crater

The older, western volcano has eroded considerably, forming the peaks of the West Maui Mountains (in Hawaiian, Mauna Kahalawai). Puʻu Kukui is the highest, at 5,788 ft (1,764 m). The larger, younger volcano to the east, Haleakalā, rises to 10,023 ft (3,055 m) above sea level, and measures 5 mi (8 km) from seafloor to summit. The eastern flanks of both volcanoes are cut by deeply incised valleys and steep-sided ravines that run downslope to the rocky, windswept shoreline. The isthmus was formed by sandy erosional deposits.

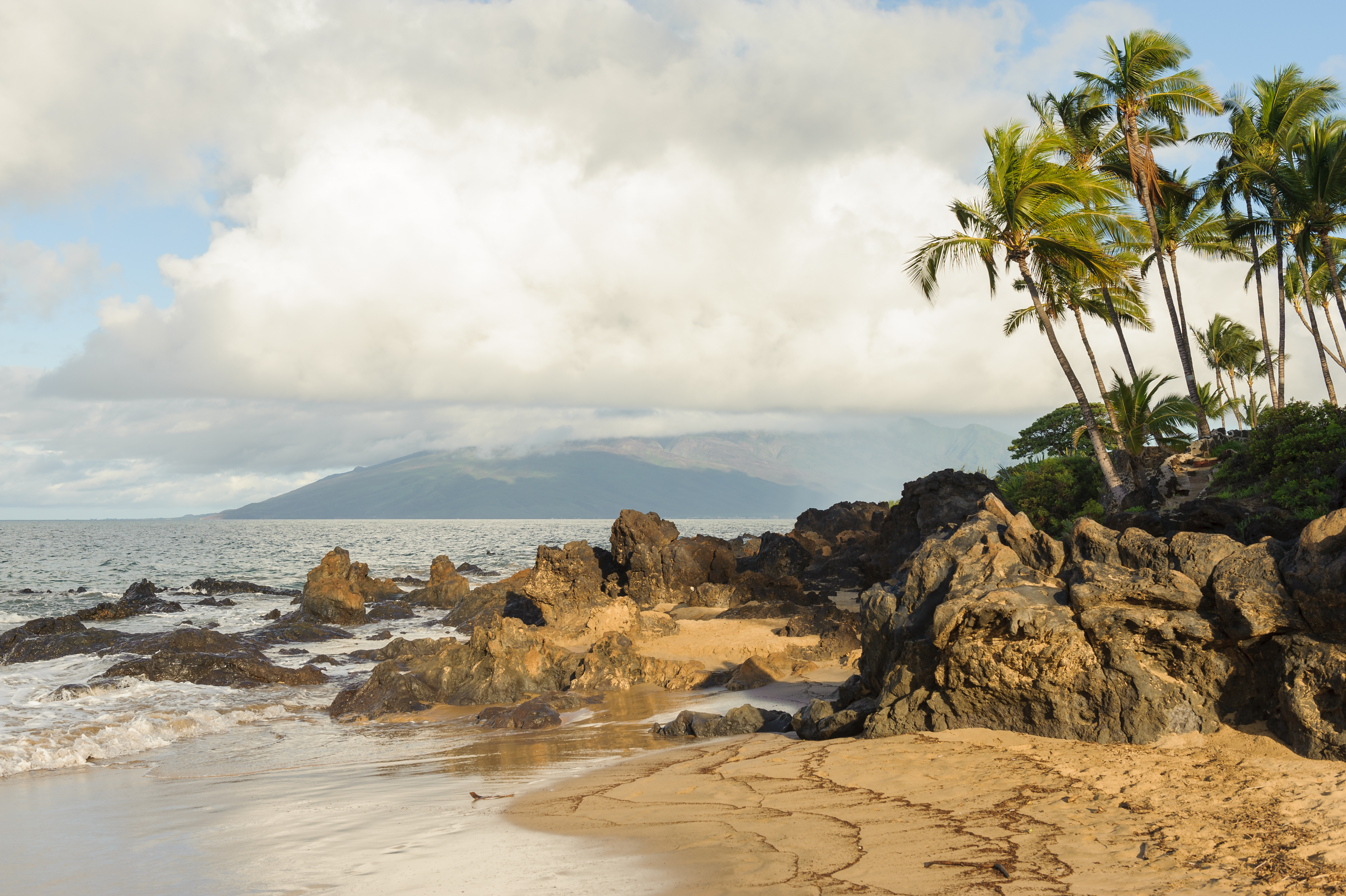
Volcanic rocks protrude on a Maui beach

Maui's last eruption (originating in Haleakalā's Southwest Rift Zone) likely occurred between 1480 and 1600; the resulting lava flows are located at Cape Kīnaʻu between ʻĀhihi Bay and La Perouse Bay. Haleakalā is dormant, but not extinct.

Maui is part of a much larger unit, Maui Nui, that includes the islands of Lānaʻi, Kahoʻolawe, Molokaʻi, and the now submerged Penguin Bank. During periods of reduced sea level, including as recently as 200,000 years ago, the channels between them become exposed and join the island into a single landmass.

== Climate ==
The climate is characterized by a two-season year, tropical and uniform temperatures at any given elevation, geographic differences in rainfall, high relative humidity, extensive cloud formations (except on the leeward coasts and at the highest elevations), and dominant trade wind flow (especially at lower elevations).

Maui has a range of climatic conditions and weather patterns:

- Half of the land is within 5 mi (8 km) of the coast, creating a strong marine influence.
- Macro weather patterns are typically determined by elevation and orientation towards the trade winds (the prevailing air flow from the northeast).
- Maui's rugged, irregular topography drives variations in conditions. Air swept inland on the trade winds is redirected by the mountains, valleys, and vast open slopes. This three-dimensional flow of air produces variations in wind speed, cloud formation, and rainfall.

Maui displays diverse climatic conditions, each of which is specific to a sub-region. These sub-regions are defined by major physiographic features (such as mountains and valleys) and by location on the windward or leeward side.

Maui's daytime temperatures average between 75 °F (24 °C) and 90 °F (32 °C) year round, while evening temperatures are about 15 °F (8.3 °C) cooler in the more humid windward areas, about 18 °F (10 °C) cooler in the drier leeward areas, and cooler still in higher elevations.

An exception to the normal pattern is the occasional winter Kona storm that brings rainfall to the South and West areas accompanied by high southwesterly winds (opposite of the prevailing trade wind direction).

=== Microclimates ===
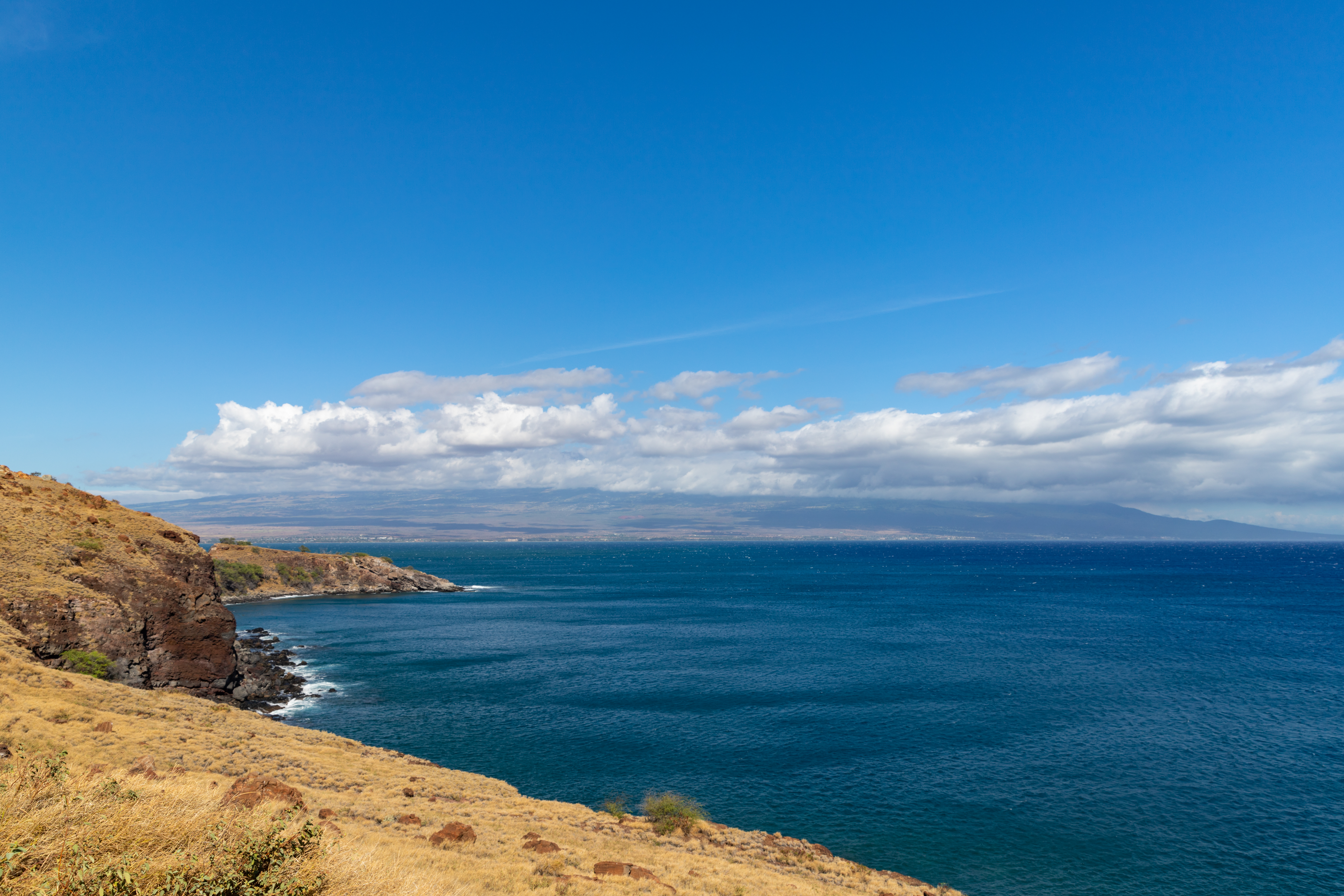
West coast, with Haleakalā and Kihei visible in the background

Maui has examples of all microclimates, each typical to specific locations.

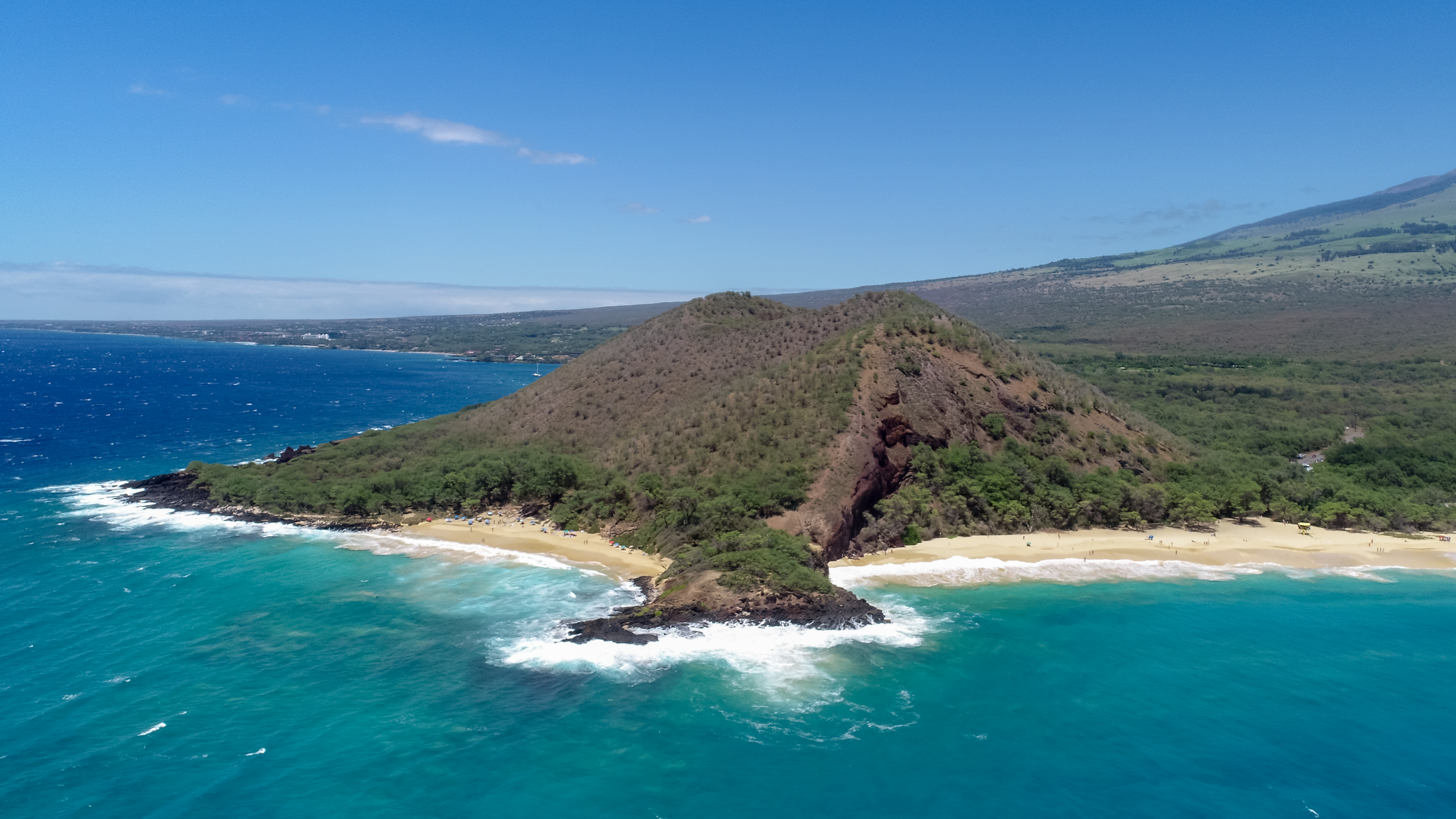
Makena Beach, South Maui

- Windward lowlands – Below 2,000 ft (610 m) on north-to-northeast sides. Roughly perpendicular to the trade winds. Moderately rainy; frequent trade wind-induced showers. Skies are often cloudy to partly cloudy. Air temperatures are relatively more uniform (and mild).
- Leeward lowlands – Daytime temperatures are higher and nighttime temperatures are lower than in windward locations. Dry weather is prevalent, except for sporadic showers that drift over the mountains to windward and during short-duration storms.
- Interior lowlands – Intermediate conditions, often sharing characteristics of other lowland sub-regions. Occasional intense afternoon showers from clouds that form due to local daytime heating.
- Leeward side high-altitude mountain slopes with high rainfall – Extensive cloud cover and rainfall all year long. Mild temperatures are prevalent, but humidity is higher than in any other sub-region.
- Leeward side lower mountain slopes – Rainfall is higher than on leeward lowlands but much less than at similar altitudes on the windward side; however, maximum rainfall usually occurs leeward of the crests of lower mountains. Temperatures are higher than on the rainy slopes of the windward sides of mountains; cloud cover is almost as extensive.
- High mountains – Above about 5,000 ft (1,500 m) on Haleakalā, rainfall decreases rapidly with elevation. Relative humidity may be ten percent or less. The state's lowest temperatures are experienced in this region: air temperatures below freezing are common.

These microclimates help to define the major regions: Central Maui; leeward South Maui and West Maui; windward North Shore and East Maui; and Upcountry.

- Central Maui consists primarily of Kahului and Wailuku, and occupies the flat isthmus between the West Maui Mountains and Haleakalā. Kahului is the center of the island and tends to keep steady, high temperatures throughout the year. The Kahului microclimate can be muggy, but usually feels relatively dry and is often breezy. The Wailuku area is closer to the West Maui Mountain range. There, rainfall is greater throughout the year and humidity is higher.
- South Maui (Kihei, Wailea, and Makena) and West Maui (Lahaina, Kaanapali, and Kapalua) are both on the leeward side. These areas are typically drier, with higher daytime temperatures (up to 92 °F (33 °C)), and the least amount of rainfall. (An exception is the high-altitude, unpopulated West Maui summit, which boasts up to 400 in (10,000 mm) of rainfall per year on its north and east side.)

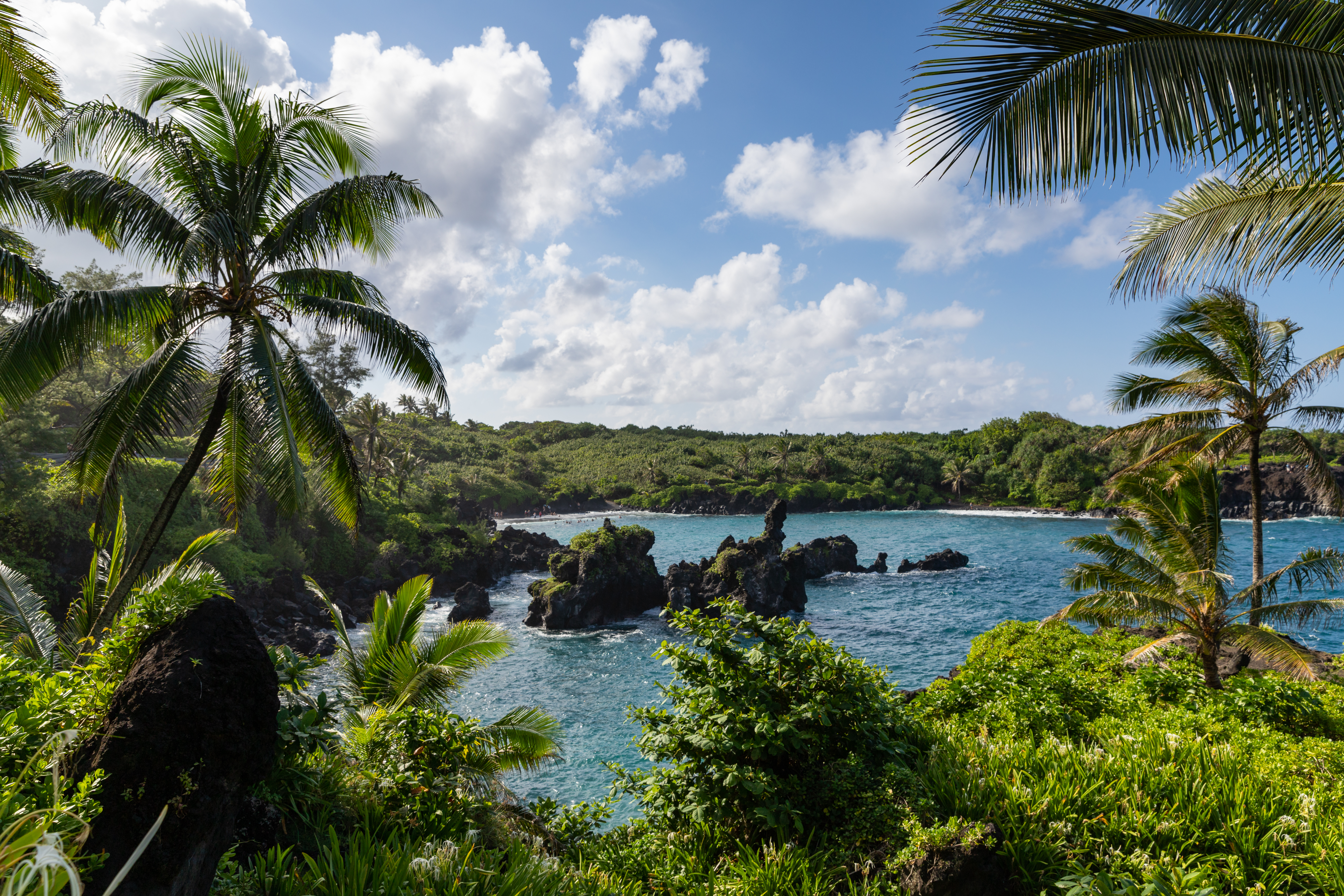
Waianapanapa State Park in East Maui, next to Hana

- The North Shore (Paia and Haiku) and East Maui (Keanae, Hana, and Kipahulu) are both on the windward side. Facing the prevailing, northeast trade winds, these areas have heavier rainfall levels, which increase considerably at higher elevations.
- Upcountry Maui is the name for the sloping area on the western face of Haleakalā, including the towns of Makawao, Pukalani, and Kula. This area ranges from 1,500 ft (460 m) to 4,500 ft (1,400 m), and the climate tends toward mild heat (between 70 °F (21 °C) and 80 °F (27 °C)) during the day and cool evenings. The higher the elevation, the cooler the evenings: during Maui's winter, Upper Kula can be as cold as 40 °F (4 °C) in the early morning hours and the Haleakalā summit can dip below freezing and become covered in snow.

Climate data for Maui
| Month | Jan | Feb | Mar | Apr | May | Jun | Jul | Aug | Sep | Oct | Nov | Dec |
|---|---|---|---|---|---|---|---|---|---|---|---|---|
| Average sea temperature °F (°C) | 76.3 (24.6) | 75.5 (24.2) | 75.3 (24.1) | 75.9 (24.4) | 76.8 (24.9) | 77.7 (25.4) | 78.6 (25.9) | 79.3 (26.3) | 80 (26.7) | 80 (26.7) | 78.9 (26.1) | 77.1 (25.1) |
Source: meteodb.com

=== Rainfall ===
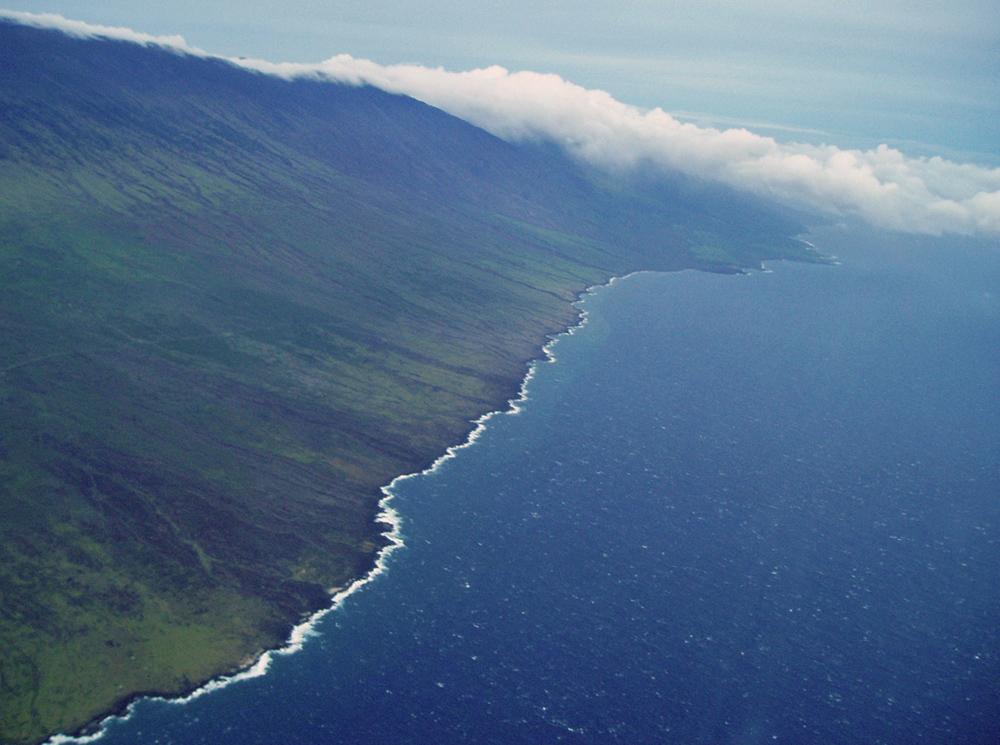
Kahikinui coastline near Kaupo

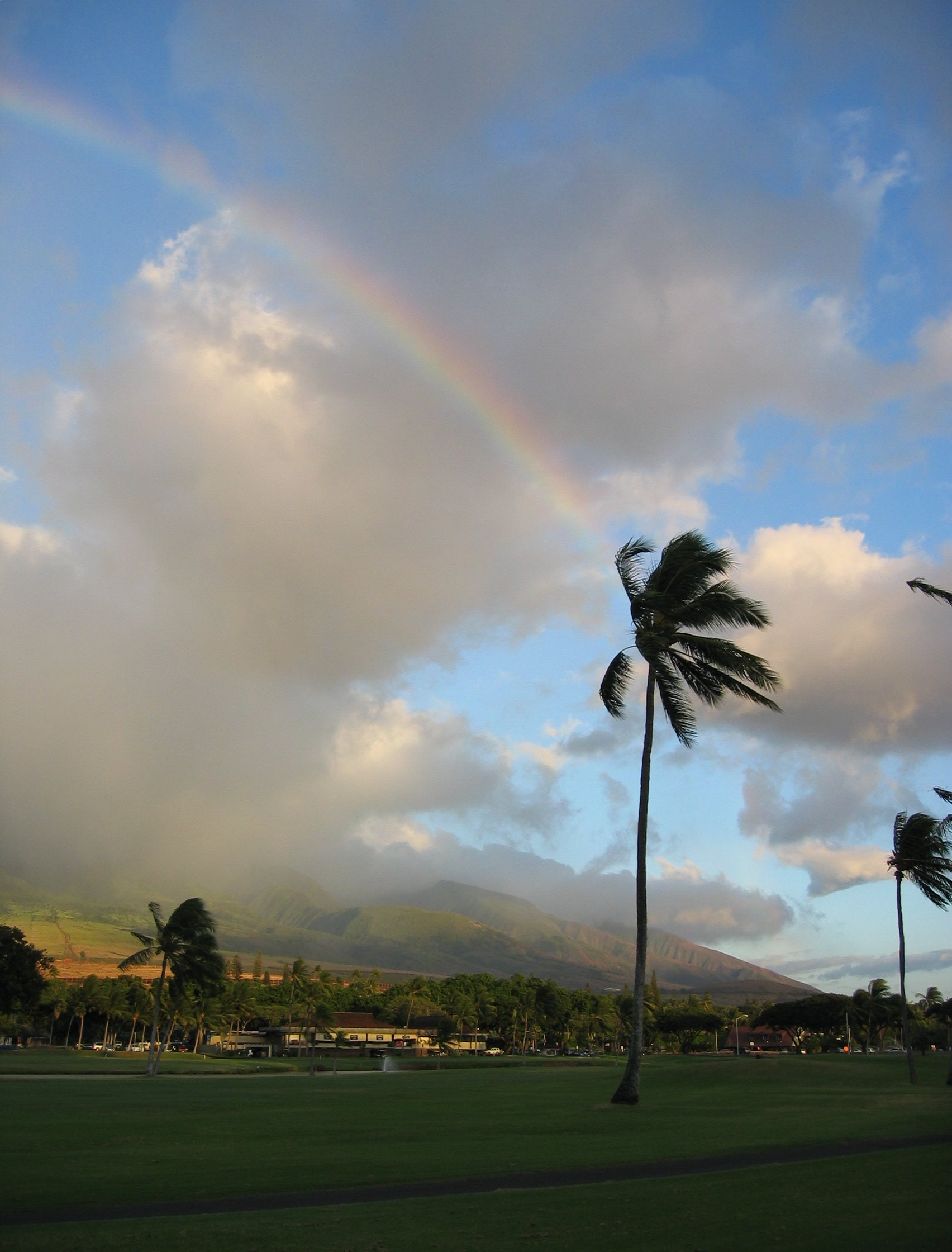
Rainbow over the West Maui Mountains after rainfall in Kāʻanapali

Showers are common; while some of these are heavy, the majority are light and brief. Thunder and lightning are rare, even during intense storms. Throughout the lowlands, summer trade winds produce a drier season. Annual rainfall averages 17–20 inches (430–510 mm) in leeward coastal areas, such as the shoreline from Maalaea Bay to Kaupo. At the other extreme, the average exceeds 300 in (7,600 mm) along the lower windward slopes of Haleakalā, particularly along Hāna Highway. Big Bog, a spot on the edge of Haleakalā National Park overlooking Hana at about 5,400 ft (1,600 m) elevation had an estimated mean annual rainfall of 404 in (10,300 mm) over the 30-year period of 1978 to 2007. If the islands of Hawaii did not exist, the average annual rainfall on the same patch of water would be about 25 in (640 mm). Instead, the mountainous topography induces an average of about 70 in (1,800 mm).

Maui

Climate chart (precipitation, max. and min. temperature)
| J | F | M | A | M | J | J | A | S | O | N | D |
| 33 20 7 | 31 19 6 | 40 21 6 | 11 22 5 | 10 23 8 | 4 21 9 | 20 26 11 | 3 28 11 | 7 26 8 | 36 22 8 | 9 20 8 | 12 20 6 |
- █ Average max. and min. temperatures in °C
- █ Precipitation totals in mm
Imperial conversion
| J | F | M | A | M | J | J | A | S | O | N | D |
| 1.3 68 45 | 1.2 66 43 | 1.6 70 43 | 0.4 72 41 | 0.4 73 46 | 0.2 70 48 | 0.8 79 52 | 0.1 82 52 | 0.3 79 46 | 1.4 72 46 | 0.4 68 46 | 0.5 68 43 |
- █ Average max. and min. temperatures in °F
- █ Precipitation totals in inches

In the lowlands, rainfall is most likely to occur during night or morning hours, and least likely in mid-afternoon. The most pronounced daily variations in rainfall occur during the summer because summer rainfall generally consists of night-time trade wind showers. Winter rainfall in the lowlands is the result of storm activity, which is as likely to occur in the daytime as at night. Rainfall variability is far greater during the winter when occasional storms contribute appreciably to rainfall totals. Such wide swings in rainfall produce occasional droughts, sometimes causing economic losses. These occur when winter rains fail to produce sufficient significant rain, impacting normally dry areas outside the trade winds that depend on them the most. The winter of 2011–2012 produced extreme drought on the leeward sides Maui, and some other islands.

=== Natural history ===
Maui is home to a large rainforest on the northeastern flanks of Haleakalā, which serves as the drainage basin for that side.

Maui is home to many coral reefs. However, many have been damaged by pollution, run-off, and tourism, although sea turtles, dolphins, and Hawaii's tropical fish remain abundant. Leeward Maui once had a dry cloud forest, but this was destroyed by human activities over the last three hundred years.

=== Wildlife ===
Maui is the leading whale-watching center in the Hawaiian Islands for the humpback whales who winter in Maui County's sheltered ʻAuʻau Channel. These mammals migrate approximately 3,500 mi (5,600 km) from Alaskan waters each autumn and spend November–April mating and birthing in the warm waters. They are typically sighted in pods: small groups of several adults, or groups of a mother, her calf, and a few suitors. Humpbacks are an endangered species protected by U.S. federal and Hawaiʻi state law. An estimated 21,000-26,000 humpbacks live in North Pacific waters. Although they face many dangers, due to pollution, commercial vessels, and military sonar testing, their numbers have increased rapidly in recent years, estimated at 7% growth per year.

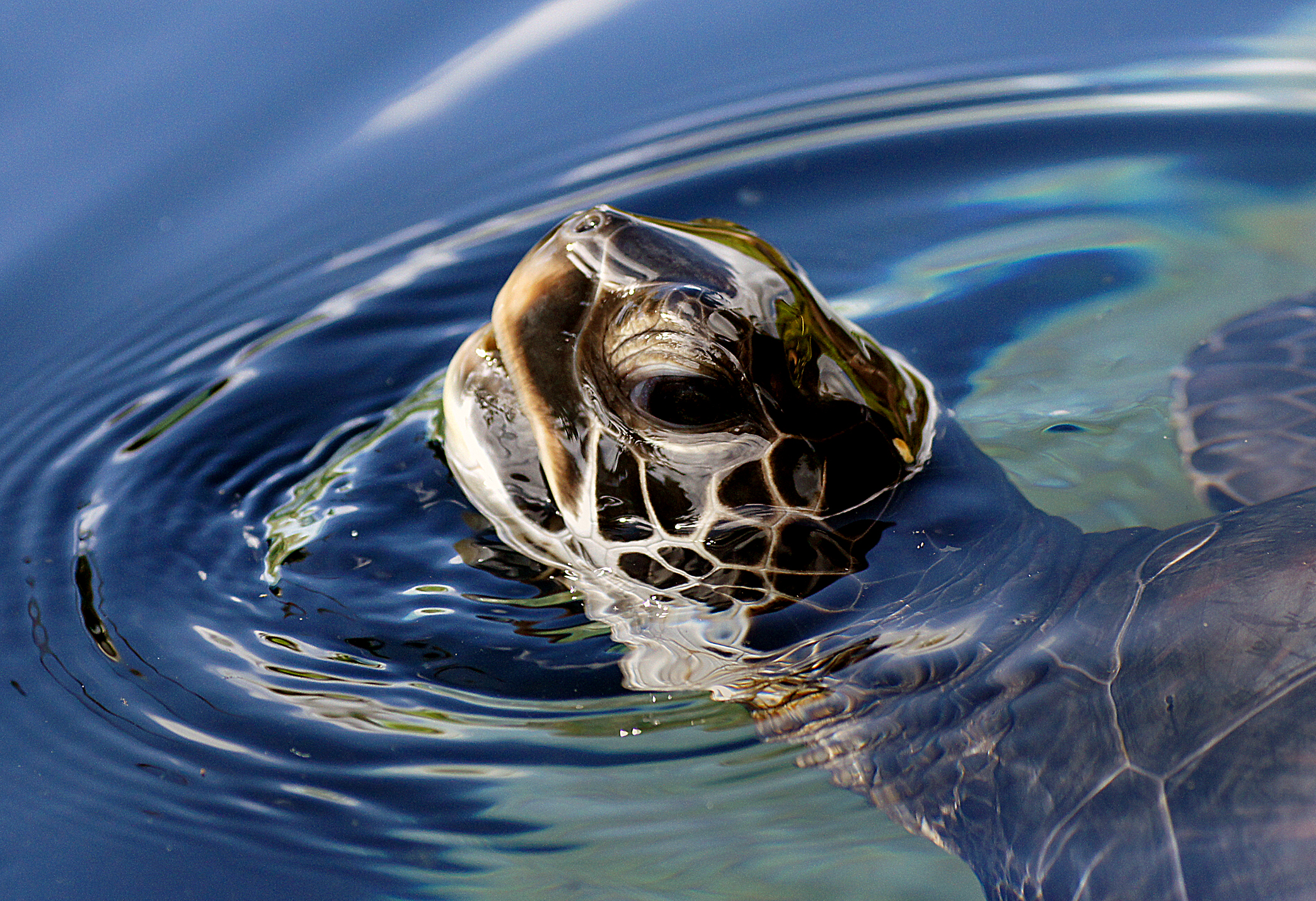
A green sea turtle near Maui

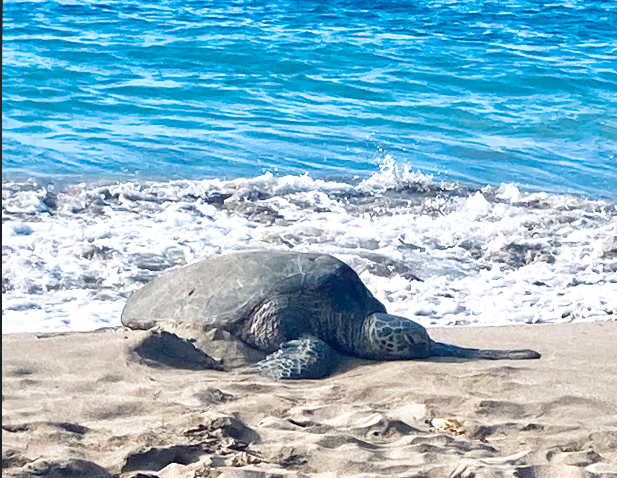
Turtle resting after a long swim in (Maui, Hawaii)

Birdlife lacks the concentration of endemic species found in some other Hawaiian islands. As recently as 200,000 years ago Maui was part of Maui Nui, thus reducing the odds that birds or other species would be endemic to any single one of these. Although Molokaʻi had several endemic bird species, in modern times Maui Nui's other islands host little endemic birdlife. During and after the Maui Nui period, Maui hosted a species of moa-nalo (also found on Molokaʻi, Lānaʻi, and Kahoʻolawe), a species of harrier (the wood harrier, shared with Molokaʻi), an undescribed sea eagle (Maui only), and three species of ground-dwelling flightless ibis (Apteribis sp.), plus other species. Today, Maui's most notable surviving endemic birds are probably the ʻAkohekohe (Palmeria dolei) and the Maui parrotbill (Pseudonestor xanthophrys), also known as Kiwikiu, both of which are critically endangered and only found in an alpine forest on the windward slopes of Haleakalā.

Conservation efforts have examined how to mitigate female parrotbill mortality since that is a key driving factor driving population decline. The parrotbill lacks resistance to mosquito-born diseases, particularly avian malaria, so only forests above 1500 meters of elevation provide refuge. The habitat was undergoing restoration in east Maui as of 2018. As Maui's human population grew, previously undeveloped areas that provided a refuge decreased in size. More than 250 species of local flora are federally listed as endangered or threatened. Birds found on other islands as well as Maui include the ʻIʻiwi (Drepanis coccinea], ʻApapane (Himatione sanguinea), Hawaiʻi ʻAmakihi (Chlorodrepanis virens), as Maui ʻAlauahio (Paroreomyza montana) well as the Nene (Branta sandvicensis, Hawaii's state bird), Hawaiian coot (Fulica alai), Hawaiian stilt (Himantopus mexicanus knudseni).

In 2024, Haleakalā National Park began to employ the incompatible insect technique to reduce the park's mosquito population.

Maui is also home to the Hawaiian hoary bat, Hawaii's only native terrestrial mammal. Marine mammals notably include spinner, bottlenose, and spotted dolphins.

== History ==
Location within the island chain

The island of Maui with a relatively central location has given it a pivotal role in the history of the Hawaiian Islands.

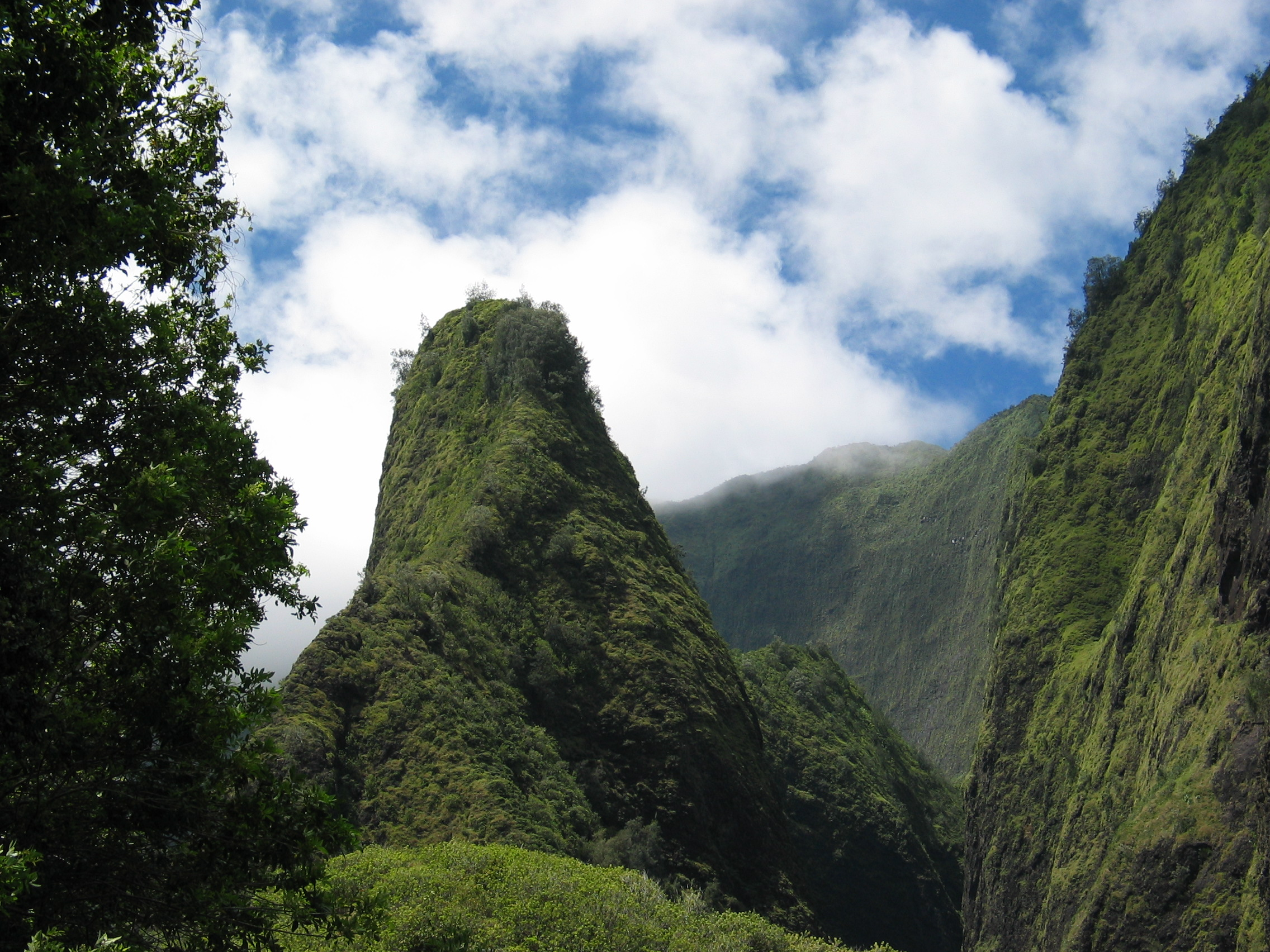
The "needle" of ʻĪao Valley

Polynesians from Tahiti were Maui's original inhabitants. They introduced the kapu system, a strict social order that affected all aspects of life and became the core of Hawaiian culture. Modern Hawaiian history began in the mid-18th century. Kamehameha I, king Hawaiʻi island, invaded Maui in 1790 and fought the inconclusive Battle of Kepaniwai. He returned to Hawaiʻi to battle a rival, subduing Maui a few years later.

=== European Contact ===
On November 26, 1778, explorer James Cook became the first European to see Maui. Cook never set foot on the island, because he was unable to find a suitable landing. The first European to come ashore was French admiral Jean-François de Galaup, comte de Lapérouse, who landed on the shores of what became La Perouse Bay on May 29, 1786. More Europeans followed: traders, whalers, loggers (e.g., of sandalwood) and missionaries. The latter began to arrive from New England in 1823, settling in Lahaina, at that time Hawaii's capitol. Missionaries taught reading and writing, devised the Hawaiian alphabet in order to translate a Bible into Hawaiian, operated a printing press in Lahaina, and began recording the islands' history, which had been transmitted only orally. The missionaries both altered and preserved the native culture. The religious work altered the culture while the literacy efforts preserved history and language. Missionaries started the first school in Lahaina, Lahainaluna Mission School, which opened in 1831 and still exists.

=== Whaling ===
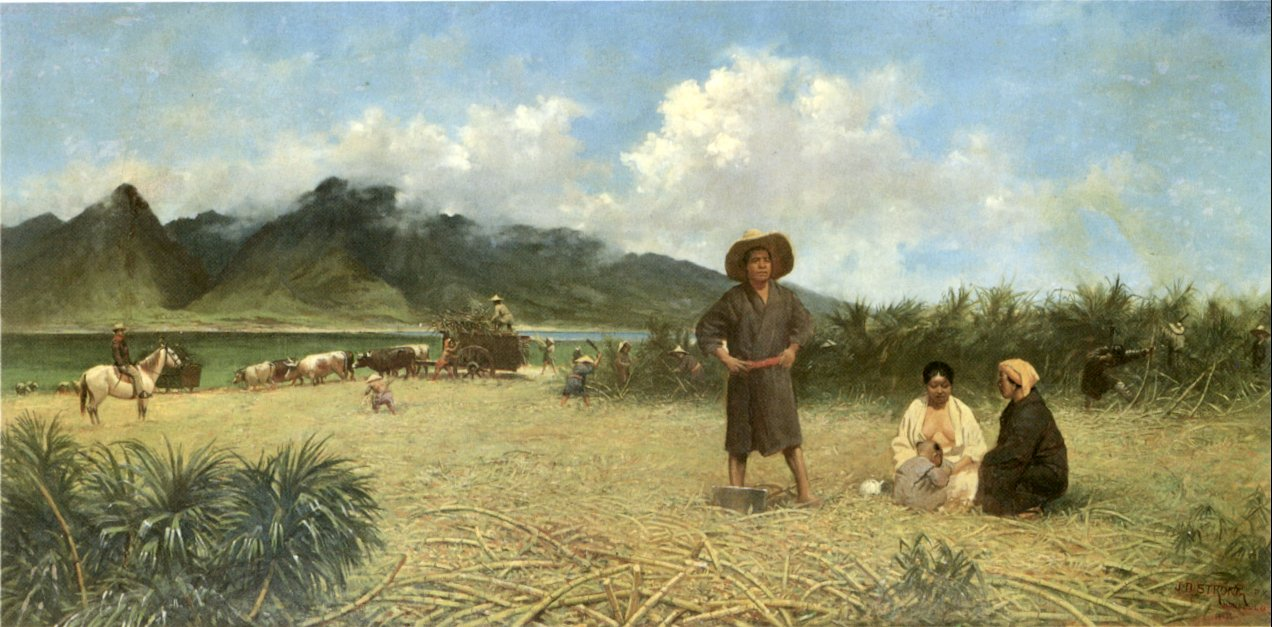
Japanese laborers on Maui harvesting sugarcane in 1885

At the height of the whaling era (1843–1860), Lahaina was a major center. In one season over 400 ships visited with up to 100 anchored at one time in Lāhainā Roads. Ships tended to stay for weeks rather than days, fostering extended drinking and the rise of prostitution, against which the missionaries battled. Whaling declined steeply at the end of the 19th century as petroleum replaced whale oil.

Along with the rest of Hawaii, Maui was part of the Hawaiian Kingdom, the Republic of Hawaii, Hawaiian territory, and the state of Hawaii.

In 1937, Vibora Luviminda trade union conducted the final ethnic strike action in the Hawaiian Islands against four Maui sugarcane plantations, demanding higher wages and the dismissal of five foremen. Manuel Fagel and nine other strike leaders were arrested, and charged with kidnapping a worker. Fagel spent four months in jail while the strike continued. Eventually, Vibora Luviminda made its point and the workers won a 15% increase in wages after 85 days on strike, but no written contract was signed.

=== World War II ===
Maui was involved in the Pacific Theater of World War II as a staging center, training base, and rest and relaxation site. At the peak in 1943–1944, more than 100,000 soldiers were based there. The main base of the 4th Marine Division was in Haiku. Beaches were used to practice landings and train in marine demolition and sabotage.

=== 2023 wildfires ===
The 2023 Hawaii wildfires were a series of wildfires that broke out in early August 2023 in the U.S. state of Hawaii, predominantly on the island of Maui. The wind-driven fires prompted evacuations and caused widespread damage, killing at least 102 people and leaving two people missing in the town of Lahaina on Maui's northwest coast. The proliferation of the wildfires was attributed to dry, gusty conditions created by a strong high-pressure area north of Hawaii and Hurricane Dora to the south.

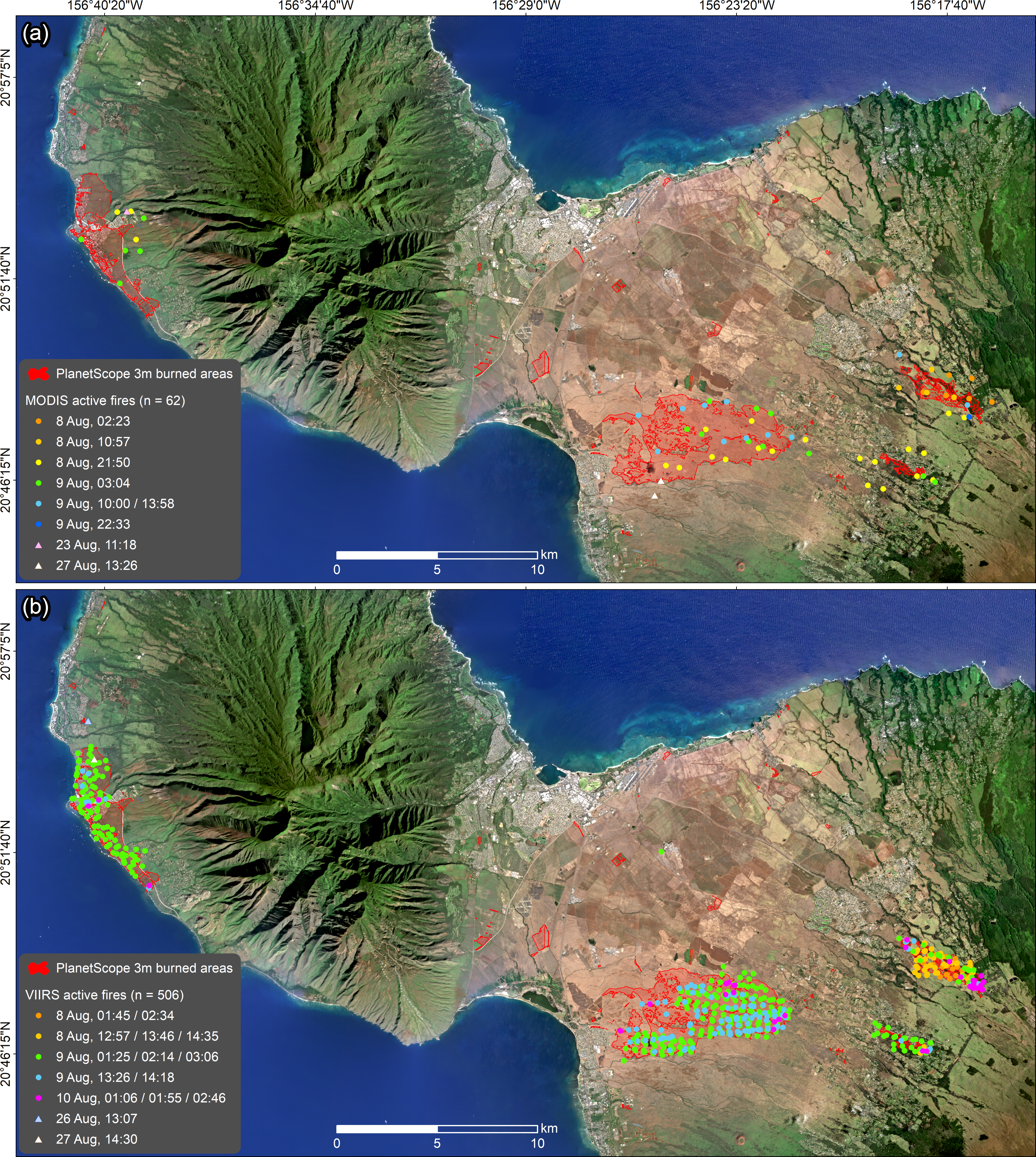
MODIS satellite 1 km and VIIRS satellite 375 m active fire detections (colored by the day of burning and whether they were detected in the daytime or nighttime) and 3 m PlanetScope burned areas (red polygons) over Maui.

== Development ==
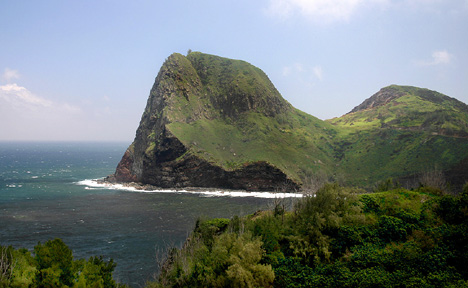
Kahakuloa Head near the tiny village of Kahakuloa on the north side of west Maui

The island experienced rapid population growth through 2007. At the time, Kīhei was one of the most rapidly growing towns in the United States. The island attracted many retirees, with accompanying service providers. Population growth produced strains, including traffic, housing cost/availability, and access to water.

In the 2000s, controversies raged over whether to allow continued real-estate development. Vacation rentals in residential neighborhoods became a flashpoint - many were unpermitted, and were later closed after enforcement escalated. The Hawaii Superferry briefly offered interisland service, before it was banned for not having completed an EIS.

The creator of the apparel company Uniqlo and the richest man in Japan, Tadashi Yanai a golf enthusiast, paid $75 million to purchase two golf courses from Maui Land & Pineapple in 2014, the company primarily controlled by Steve Case, a native of Hawaii.

In 2016, Maui residents convinced officials to switch to organic pesticides for highway applications after they learned that label requirements for glyphosate formulations had not been followed.

=== Water supply ===
Maui County
| Census | Pop. | Note | %± |
|---|---|---|---|
| 1950 | 40,103 | | — |
| 1960 | 35,717 | | −10.9% |
| 1970 | 38,691 | | 8.3% |
| 1980 | 62,823 | | 62.4% |
| 1990 | 91,361 | | 45.4% |
| 2000 | 117,644 | | 28.8% |
| 2010 | 144,444 | | 22.8% |
| 2020 | 168,307 | | 16.5% |

The new millennium brought droughts, increasing pressure on the ʻĪao aquifer, with withdrawals rising above 18 million U.S. gallons (68,000 m^{3}) per day. Recent estimates indicate that Maui has a potential supply of potable water around 415 million U.S. gallons (1,800,000 m^{3}) per day (2008 figure), virtually all of which drains into the ocean.

Water for agriculture comes mostly from East Maui streams, routed through a network of tunnels and ditches dug by Chinese laborers in the 19th century.

In 2006, Paia petitioned the county to avoid mixing in treated water from wells known to be contaminated with 1,2-dibromoethane and 1,2-dibromo-3-chloropropane from former pineapple cultivation. Agriculture companies were released from liability for these chemicals. In 2009, the Office of Hawaiian Affairs and others successfully argued in court that sugar companies should reduce the amount of water they take from four streams.

== Economy ==
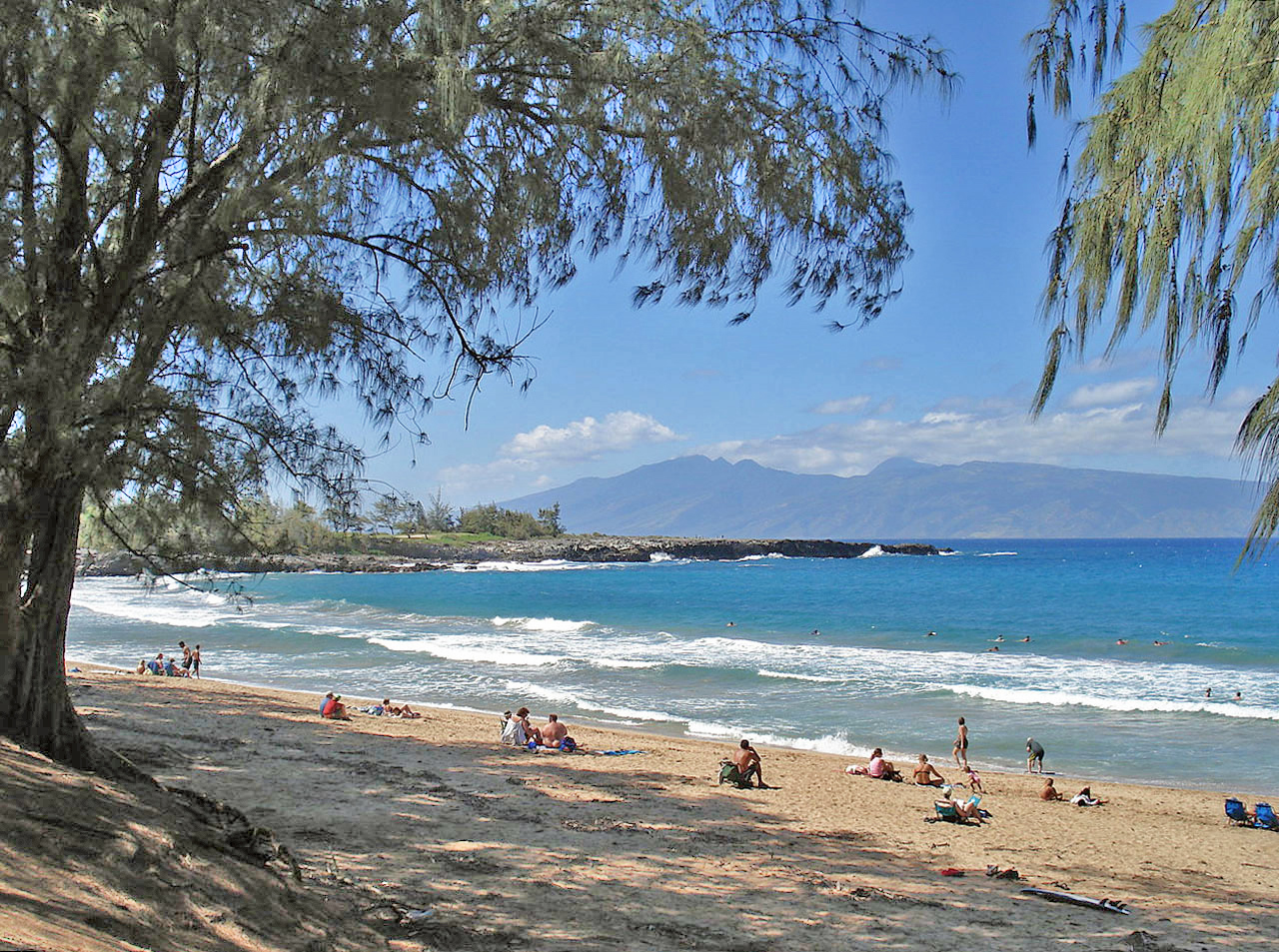
Fleming Beach near Kapalua

Tourism is Maui's major industry. Other large sectors include development, retail, business services, health care, and government. Maui has a growing presence in agriculture and information technology.

Unemployment tends to be well below the US average, e.g., 1.7% in December 2006, rising to only 9% in March 2009 before falling to 2.1% in January, 2018. The 2023 fires upended that norm, raising unemployment above the Hawaii and US figures.

=== Agriculture ===
Maui's primary agriculture products are corn and other seeds, fruits, cattle, wine, and vegetables. Maui has a history of producing pineapples and sugar cane. Specific products include coffee, macadamia nuts, papaya, flowers and fresh pineapple. In 1974, Emil Tedeschi of the Napa Valley winegrower family of Calistoga, California, established the first Hawaiian commercial winery, the Tedeschi Winery (later Maui Wine) at Ulupalakua Ranch, initially focused on pineapple wine.

Historically, Maui's primary products were sugar and pineapple. Maui Land & Pineapple Company and Hawaiian Commercial and Sugar Company (HC&S, a subsidiary of Alexander and Baldwin Company) dominated agricultural activity. In 2016, sugar production ended. Haliimaile Pineapple Co. grows pineapple on former Maui Land & Pineapple Co. land.

In November 2014, a Maui County referendum enacted a moratorium on genetically engineered crops. Shortly thereafter Monsanto and other agribusinesses obtained a court injunction suspending the moratorium.

In 2018, Canadian pension fund Public Sector Pension Investment Board purchased A&B's Maui farmlands (41,000 acres) and contracted with Mahi Pono, a subsidiary of Trinitas Partners to return these fallow lands to agriculture. Mahi Pono also has a controlling interest in Maui Cattle Company.

=== Information technology ===
Most technology organizations that are located on the island occupy the Maui Research & Technology Park which is located in Kihei. This includes the Maui Research and Technology Center and the Pacific Disaster Center. It is a program of the High Technology Development Corporation, an agency of the State of Hawaii, whose focus is to facilitate the growth of Hawaii's commercial high-technology sector.

=== Astrophysics ===
Maui is an important center for advanced astronomical research. The Haleakalā Observatory was Hawaii's first astronomical research and development facility, operating at the Maui Space Surveillance Site (MSSS) electro-optical facility. "At the 10,023-foot summit of the long-dormant volcano Haleakalā, operational satellite tracking facilities are co-located with a research and development facility providing data acquisition and communication support. The high elevation, dry climate, and freedom from light pollution offer virtually year-round observation of satellites, missiles, man-made orbital debris, and astronomical objects."

== Sports ==
=== Snorkeling/diving ===
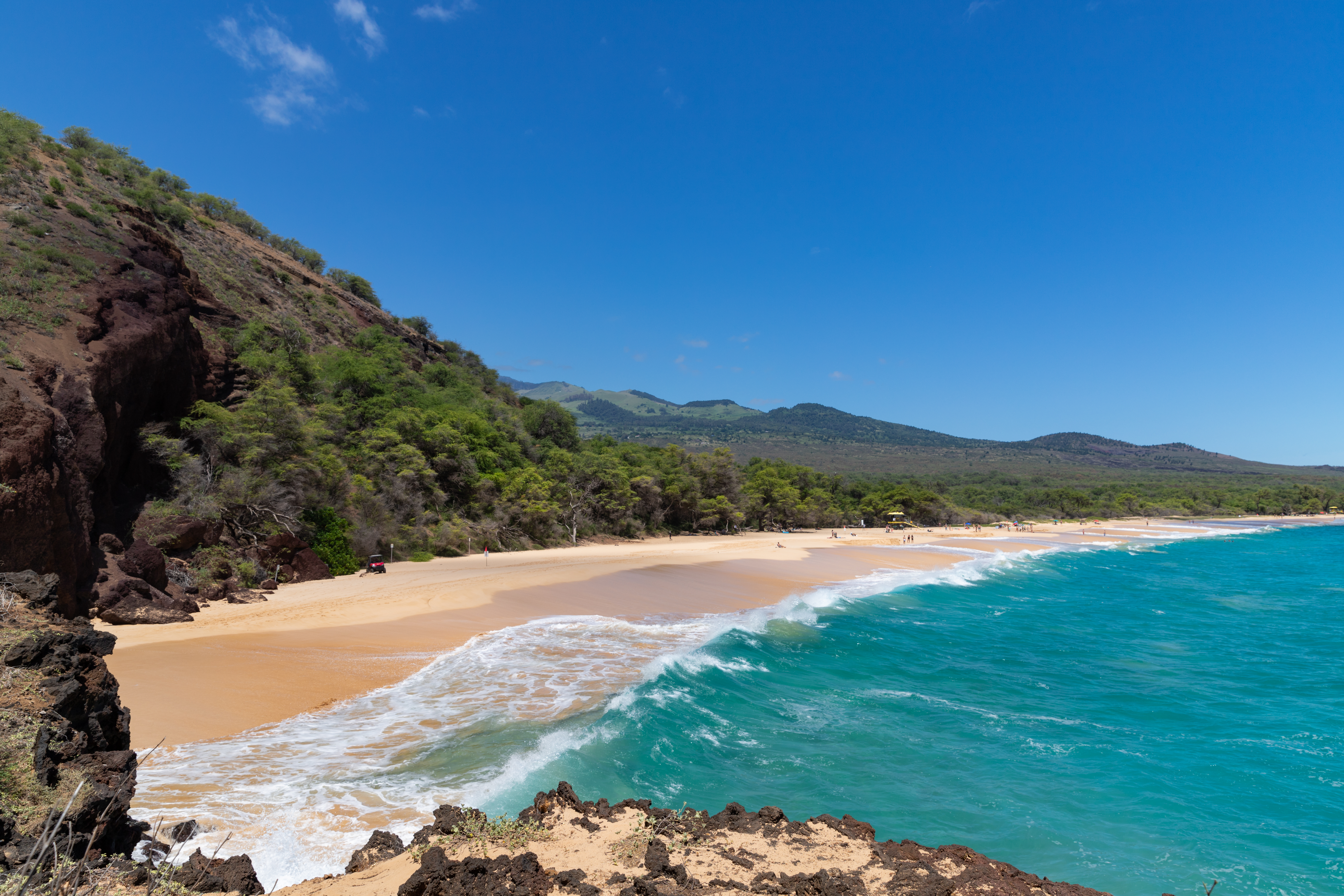
"Big Beach" in Makena, on Maui Island's southwest shore

Snorkeling and diving are popular activities on Maui, with over 30 beaches and bays and at Molokini. Maui's trade winds tend to come from the northeast, making the most popular places to snorkel on the sheltered south and west shores. Maui's ocean water is especially clear due in part to its isolation in the Central Pacific.

=== Windsurfing ===
Maui is a well-known destination for windsurfing. Kanaha Beach Park is a very well-known windsurfing spot and may have stand-up paddle boarders or surfers if there are waves and no wind. Windsurfing has evolved on Maui since the early 1980s when it was recognized as an ideal location to test equipment and publicize the sport.

=== Surfing ===
Surfing is one of Hawaii's most popular sports. Ho'okipa Beach Park is one of Maui's most famous surfing and windsurfing spots. Other frequently surfed areas include Slaughterhouse Beach, Honolua Bay, Pe'ahi (Jaws), and Fleming Beach. The north side absorbs the most swell during the winter season and the south and west in the summertime. Due to island blocking, summer south swells tend to be weak and rare. Standup paddleboarding is popular across Maui.

=== Kitesurfing ===
Kitesurfing is popular, particularly at Kanaha Beach Park.

== Tourism ==
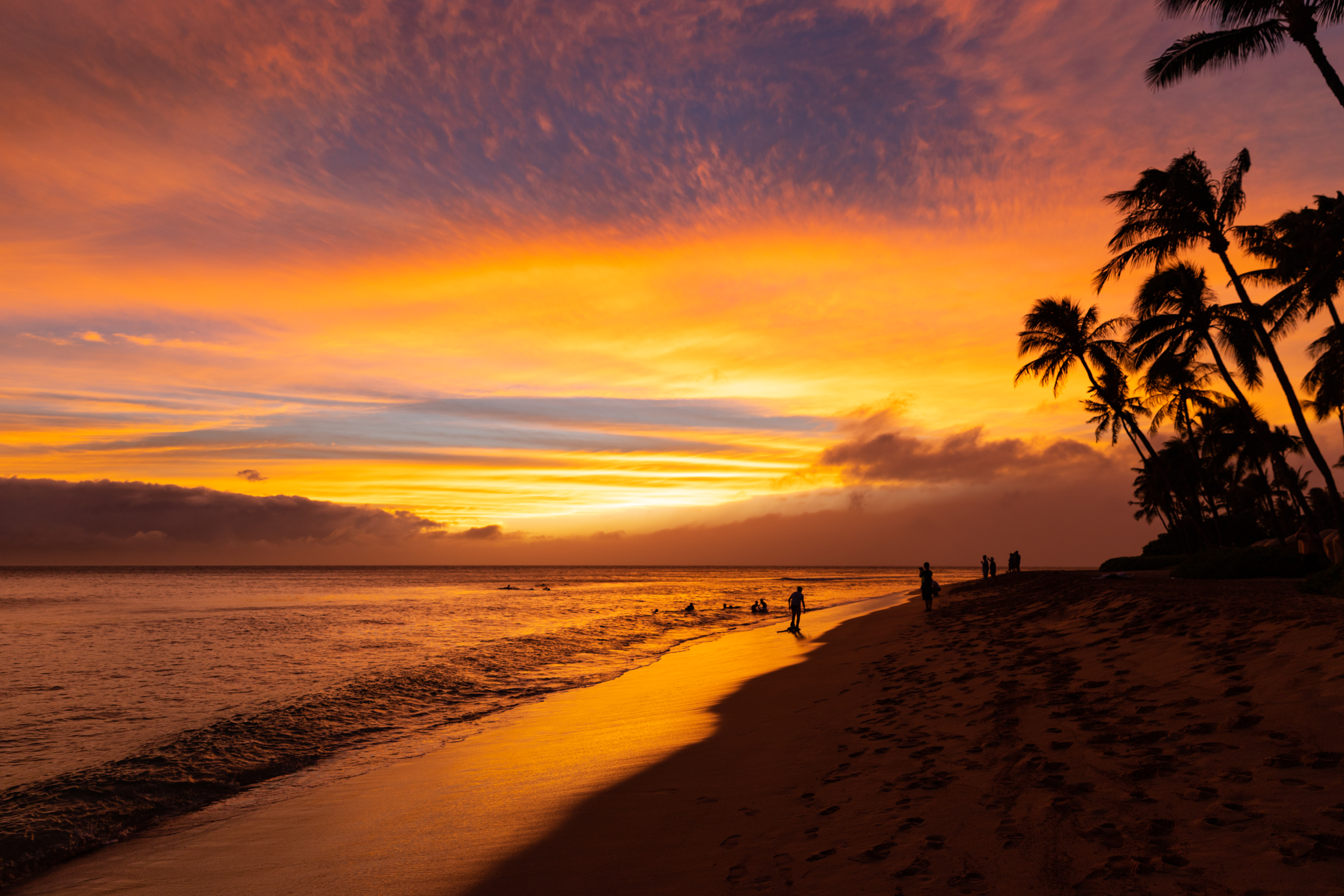
Kaanapali beach in Lahaina

The main tourist attractions are Hāna and Haleakalā National Park. Hāna Highway runs along the east coast, crossing many streams and passing black sand beaches and waterfalls. Haleakalā National Park is home to Haleakalā, a dormant volcano. Another attraction is the Maui Ocean Center aquarium in Ma'alaea.

However, visitors spend most of their time at and around the resorts in West Maui (Kāʻanapali, Nāpili-Honokōwai, Kahana, Napili, Kapalua) and South Maui (Kīhei, Wailea-Mākena). Cruise ships dock at Kahului Harbor. Smaller ports at Lahaina Harbor (temporarily closed) and Maʻalaea Harbor (located between Lahaina and Kihei). The town of Lahaina was a popular attraction until the 2023 fires, but is closed indefinitely.

While winning travel industry awards as Best Island In The World in recent years some locals and environmentalists criticized what they saw as overdevelopment. Activist groups such as Save Makena have taken the government to court to protect local citizens' rights.

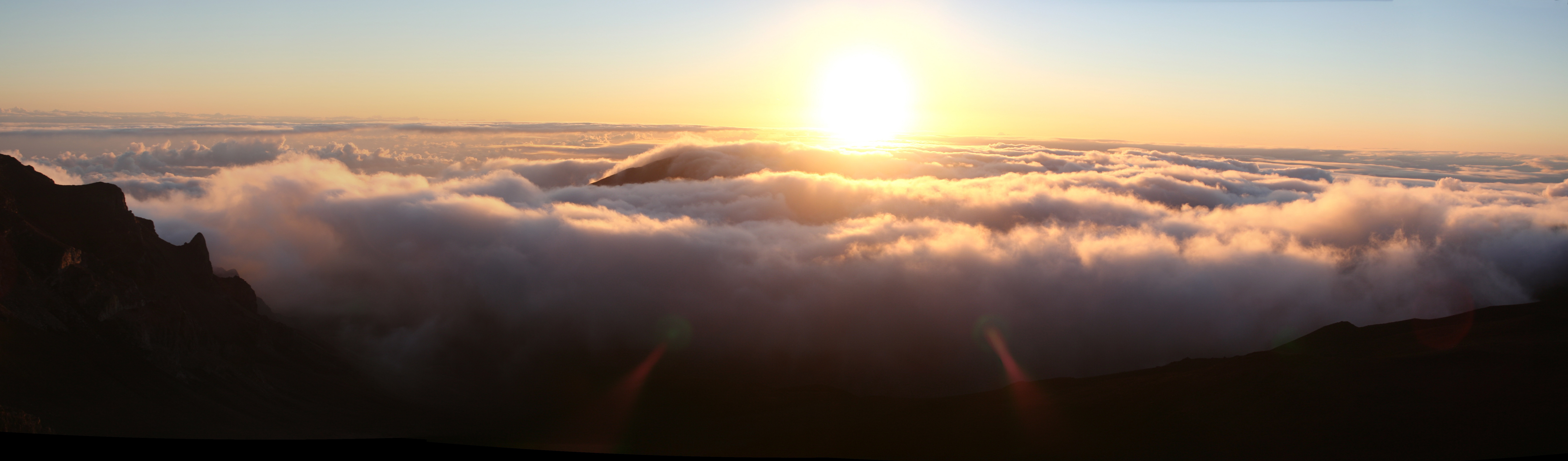
Sunrise at Haleakalā

== Transport ==
=== Public bus ===
Maui Bus is the public transportation service of the island of Maui, Hawaii, and is operated by Roberts Hawaii under a public-private partnership with Maui County government. They operate 13 regular local bus routes and 4 commuter routes, which have a single early morning run and a return trip in the afternoon.

=== Airports ===
Three airports provide air service to Maui:

- Hana Airport provides regional service to eastern Maui.
- Kahului Airport in central Maui is the primary commercial airport.
- Kapalua Airport provides regional service to western Maui.

=== Major highways ===
All route numbers on Maui begin with the number 3. Two-digit routes represent primary highways, which are maintained by the state. Three- and four-digit routes typically serve as secondary arterials, with the first two digits often corresponding to an associated primary highway. Some of these secondary routes are county-maintained and may remain unsigned.

- Route 30—Honoapiʻilani Highway
- Route 31—Piʻilani Highway
- Route 32—W Main St/Kaʻahumanu Av
- Route 36—Hāna Highway
- Route 37—Haleakalā Highway/Kula Highway
- Route 303—Puʻukoliʻi Road
- Route 310—North Kīhei Road
- Route 311—Maui Veterans Highway
- Route 340—Kahekili Highway
- Route 360—Hāna Highway/Keawa Pl
- Route 365
- Route 366—Haʻikū Rd, Kokomo Rd
- Route 371—Haliʻimalie Rd
- Route 377—Haleakala Highway/Kekaulike Av
- Route 378—Haleakala Highway
- Route 380—Kuihelani Highway
- Route 390—Baldwin Avenue
- Route 3000—Lāhainā Bypass

== Healthcare ==
Malama I Ke Ola Health Center and Maui Memorial Medical Center (MMMC) are the only acute care hospital in Maui County. Kula Hospital is a critical access hospital located on the southern half in the rural town of Kula. Kula Hospital is an MMMC affiliate. Although not technically a hospital or emergency room, Hana Health Clinic (or Hana Medical Center), works in cooperation with American Medical Response and MMMC to stabilize and transport patients with emergent medical conditions. These facilities operate 24/7.

== Notable people ==
- Sil Lai Abrams, writer
- Luther Aholo (1833– 1888), politician
- Lydia Kaʻonohiponiponiokalani Aholo (1878– 1979), daughter of Queen Liliʻuokalani
- Wallace M. Alexander (1869– 1939), businessman
- Irmgard Farden Aluli (1911– 2001), songwriter
- Renee Alway, fashion model
- Samuel C. Armstrong (1839– 1893), Union Army general
- Chris Berman, ESPN sportscaster
- Cedric Ceballos, former NBA basketball player
- Charlie Chong (1926– 2007), politician
- Alice Cooper, musician
- William H. Cornwell (1843– 1903), businessman
- Destin Daniel Cretton, film director and screenwriter
- Dylan Donkin, rock musician
- Lani Doherty, surfer
- Clint Eastwood, actor/director
- Joe Eszterhas, Hungarian-American screenwriter and author
- Thomas Wright Everett (1823– 1895), former governor of Maui (1882– 1883)
- Harry Field (1911– 1964), former American football player
- Mick Fleetwood, musician
- Abraham Fornander (1812– 1887), judge
- Beverly Gannon, chef
- Amy Hānaialiʻi Gilliom, songwriter
- Kendall Grove, mixed martial artist
- Barney F. Hajiro (1916– 2011), Medal of Honor recipient
- S. N. Haleʻole (1819– 1866), writer and historian
- Woody Harrelson, actor
- George Harrison (1943– 2001), musician/guitarist of the Beatles
- Hon Chew Hee (1906– 1993), artist
- David Kahalekula Kaʻauwai (1833– 1856), politician
- William Hoapili Kaʻauwai (1835– 1874), politician
- Zorobabela Kaʻauwai (1799– 1856), politician
- Willie K (1960– 2020), musician
- Anthony T. Kahoʻohanohano (1930– 1951), Medal of Honor recipient
- Kapahei Kauai (1825– 1893), judge
- Helio Koaʻeloa (1815– 1846), missionary
- Kamaka Kūkona, musician
- Kris Kristofferson, musician
- Charles Lindbergh (1902– 1974), aviator
- Garrett Lisi, physicist
- James Makee (1813– 1879), businessman
- David Malo (1793– 1853), historian
- Cecilia Suyat Marshall, historian
- Patsy Mink (1927– 2002), lawyer and politician
- Andy Miyamoto, former baseball player
- Dave Murray, musician/guitarist of Iron Maiden
- Jim Nabors (1930– 2017), actor/singer
- George Naea (died 1854), high chief of the Kingdom of Hawaii
- Linda Nagata, author
- Betsy Nagelsen, former tennis player
- Don Nelson, former NBA basketball player and coach
- Willie Nelson, musician
- Danny Ongais, former CART, IndyCar, Formula One driver
- Kalani Pe'a, songwriter
- Jeff Peterson, musician
- Poncie Ponce (1933– 2013), actor and comedian
- Richard Pryor (1940– 2005) comedian
- Puaaiki (1785– 1844), preacher
- Michael Reeves, YouTube personality
- Kealiʻi Reichel, musician
- Bob Rock, musician/record producer
- Will Rodgers, NASCAR driver
- Tadashi Sato (1923– 2005), artist
- Daniel Scott, American soccer player
- Zach Scott, American soccer player
- Mike Stone, martial artist
- Kurt Suzuki, baseball player
- Hannibal Tavares (1919– 1998), politician
- Kanekoa Texeira, a former baseball pitcher who is currently the manager for the Mississippi Braves
- Kiana Tom, television host for ESPN
- Rose Tribe (1890– 1934), singer
- Shan Tsutsui, former Lieutenant Governor of Hawaii (2012– 2018)
- Steven Tyler, lead singer of Aerosmith
- Camile Velasco, singer
- Shane Victorino, former baseball outfielder
- Armine von Tempski (1892– 1943), writer
- Robert William Wilcox (1855– 1903), politician
- Owen Wilson, actor
- Oprah Winfrey, talk show host
- Becky Worley, journalist
- Weird Al Yankovic, musician
- Wally Yonamine (1925– 2011), athlete

== See also ==
- National Register of Historic Places listings for Maui

== Publications ==
- Kyselka, Will; Lanterman, Ray E. (1980). Maui, How It Came to Be. University of Hawaii Press. ISBN 978-0-8248-0530-2.
