= Matthew Doherty =

Matthew or Matt Doherty may refer to:

== Footballers ==
- Matt Doherty (footballer, born 1916) (1916–1961), Northern Irish footballer and manager for Derry City FC
- Matt Doherty (footballer, born 1940) (1940–2019), Northern Irish footballer who played for Derry City FC and Glentoran FC, son of the above
- Matt Doherty (footballer, born 1992), Irish footballer signed to Wolverhampton Wanderers

== Others ==
- Matt Doherty (basketball) (born 1962), American basketball coach
- Matt Doherty (actor) (born 1978), American actor
- Matthew Doherty (homelessness official), former executive director of the United States Interagency Council on Homelessness
- Matthew Doherty, mayor of Belmar, New Jersey
