= James Dougherty =

James Dougherty or Jim Dougherty may refer to:

- Jim Dougherty (baseball) (born 1968), Major League Baseball pitcher
- Jim Dougherty (footballer) (1878–1944), English footballer
- James Dougherty (Medal of Honor) (1839–1897), U.S. Marine and Medal of Honor recipient
- Sir James Dougherty (civil servant) (1844–1934), Member of Parliament for Londonderry City, 1914–1918
- James Dougherty (police officer) (1921–2005), first husband of Marilyn Monroe
- Jimmie Dougherty (born 1978), American football coach and former player
- James Witt Dougherty (1813–1879), Californian politician, rancher, and landowner

== See also ==
- James Doherty (disambiguation)
- James Daugherty (1889–1974), American modernist painter
