= Seán Doherty =

Seán Doherty may refer to:

- Sean Doherty (biathlete) (born 1995), American biathlete
- Seán Doherty (composer) (born 1987), Irish composer, musicologist and singer
- Sean Doherty (ethicist) (born 1980), British Anglican priest, academic and ethicist
- Sean Doherty (footballer) (born 1985), English football player
- Seán Doherty (Gaelic footballer) (1947–2025), Gaelic football manager and player for Dublin
- Seán Doherty (Mayo politician) (died 1985), Irish Fianna Fáil politician from Mayo
- Seán Doherty (Roscommon politician) (1944–2005), Irish Fianna Fáil politician, TD and senator from Roscommon

== See also ==
- Shaun Doherty (born 1964), Irish radio presenter
