= Charlie Doherty =

Australian footballer

Personal information
- Full name: Charles Somerville Doherty
- Born: 23 January 1876; Lucknow, Victoria
- Died: 5 March 1961 (aged 85); Bairnsdale, Victoria
- Original team: Ballarat

Playing career^{1}
Years	Club	Games (Goals)
1898	Fitzroy	2 (0)
- ^{1} Playing statistics correct to the end of 1898.

Charlie Doherty (23 January 1876 – 5 March 1961) was an Australian rules footballer who played with Fitzroy in the Victorian Football League (VFL).

== Sources ==
- Holmesby, Russell & Main, Jim (2009). The Encyclopedia of AFL Footballers. 8th ed. Melbourne: Bas Publishing.
- Charlie Doherty's playing statistics from AFL Tables
- Charlie Doherty at AustralianFootball.com
