= 1963–64 Irish Cup =

Tournament details
- Country: Northern Ireland
- Teams: 16

Final positions
- Champions: Derry City (3rd win)
- Runners-up: Glentoran

Tournament statistics
- Matches played: 18
- Goals scored: 63 (3.5 per match)

The 1963–64 Irish Cup was the 84th edition of the Irish Cup, the premier knock-out cup competition in Northern Irish football. It began on 22 February 1964, and concluded on 25 April with the final.

The trophy was won by Derry City, who won the trophy for the third time defeating Glentoran in the final. The defending champions were Linfield, who were defeated 2–0 in the first round by Crusaders.

There was also a qualifying round, which saw four junior teams qualify for the first round: Ballyclare Comrades (1–0 against Brantwood), Banbridge Town (1–0 against Larne), Carrick Rangers (4–3 against Queen's University), and Newry Town (2–1 against Dundela).

== Results ==
=== First round ===
Team 1	Score	Team 2
Ards	1–1	Glentoran
Banbridge Town	2–1	Ballyclare Comrades
Coleraine	2–2	Bangor
Crusaders	2–0	Linfield
Derry City	3–1	Carrick Rangers
Distillery	1–1	Ballymena United
Newry Town	0–1	Cliftonville
Portadown	4–1	Glenavon

==== Replays ====
Team 1	Score	Team 2
Ballymena United	1–2	Distillery
Bangor	0–4	Coleraine
Glentoran	2–2	Ards

==== Second replay ====
Team 1	Score	Team 2
Ards	0–4	Glentoran

=== Quarter-finals ===
Team 1	Score	Team 2
Banbridge Town	3–0	Cliftonville
Coleraine	3–1	Portadown
Crusaders	2–2	Glentoran
Derry City	5–0	Distillery

==== Replay ====
Team 1	Score	Team 2
Glentoran	2–0	Crusaders

=== Semi-finals ===
Team 1	Score	Team 2
Derry City	3–0	Banbridge Town
Glentoran	2–0	Coleraine

=== Final ===
25 April 1964

Derry City	2 – 0	Glentoran
Wilson 87'; Doherty 89'	Report

Windsor Park, Belfast
Attendance: 19,000
