= Edward Doherty =

Edward Doherty may refer to:

- Eddie Doherty (1890–1975), reporter, author, screenwriter and priest
- Edward P. Doherty (1838–1897), Irish-Canadian officer, led the soldiers who captured and killed Lincoln's assassin
- Ed Doherty (American football) (1918–2000), American football player and coach
- Ed Doherty (baseball executive) (1900–1971), American baseball executive
- Ed Doherty (politician) (born 1949), Canadian politician
