= Hugh Doherty =

Hugh Doherty may refer to:

- Hugh Doherty (footballer) (1921–2014), Irish footballer (Celtic FC, Blackpool, Derry City F.C)
- Hugh Doherty (Irish politician) (1903–1972), Irish Fianna Fáil politician
- Hugh Doherty (Irish republican), Irish republican and former Provisional IRA volunteer
- Hugh Doherty (pentathlete) (1940–2006), Australian Olympic modern pentathlete

== See also ==
- Laurence Doherty (Hugh Laurence Doherty, 1875–1919), tennis player
- Hugh O'Doherty (died 1924), Irish nationalist politician
