= Jim Doherty (shooter) =

Clay pigeon shooter

- Born: Paisley
- Known for: Shooting
- Parent(s): Seamus, Nora

Jim Doherty is a clay pigeon shooter. He hails from Newtowncunningham, County Donegal, and has excelled in clay pigeon shooting both at national and international level, and has captained his national clay pigeon team. In 2011, he became the first Irishman to win all four home majors in clay pigeon shooting. He received the Donegal Sport Star Award in January 2012.

Born in Paisley, his father Seamus Doherty came from Ballyshannon and his mother Nora came from Gweedore. Doherty has competed across Ireland and Europe, as well as New Zealand, Australia, the Caribbean and South Korea. He also enjoys Gaelic games and rugby union.
