= Ray Gough =

Northern Irish footballer

Personal information
- Full name: Raymond John Gough
- Date of birth: 8 February 1938
- Place of birth: Belfast, Northern Ireland
- Date of death: 11 March 2018 (aged 80)
- Place of death: Exeter, England
- Position: Left half

Youth career
- 11th Belfast Boys' Brigade

Senior career*
Years	Team	Apps	(Gls)
1955–1957	Crusaders		(3)
1957–1963	Linfield		
1963	Exeter City	0	(0)
–1964	Toronto Italia		
1964–1965	Millwall	13	(0)
1965–1969	Weymouth		
1969–1971	Bath City		

International career
1956–1957	Northern Ireland Amateurs	3	(0)
1960	Irish League XI	2	(0)
- * Club domestic league appearances and goals

Raymond John Gough (8 February 1938 — 11 March 2018) was a Northern Irish football left half who played in the Football League for Millwall.
