= Peter Doherty =

Pete or Peter Doherty may refer to:

- Pete Doherty (born 1979), English musician
  - Peter Doherty and the Puta Madres
- Pete Dougherty (DJ and producer), an American House musician under the alias "Moon Boots"
- Pete Doherty (wrestler) (1945-2026), American wrestler
- Peter Doherty (immunologist) (born 1940), Australian immunologist and Nobel Prize winner
- Peter Doherty (footballer) (1913–1990), Northern Ireland footballer
- Peter Doherty (comics), British comic-book artist

== See also ==
- Peter Docherty (1929–1957), English footballer
- Peter O'Doherty, Australian musician and artist
- Stalking Pete Doherty, a rockumentary
