= Lani Doherty =

American surfer

- Born: April 14, 1993 (age 32)
- Occupation: surfer

Kalulani "Lani" Doherty (born April 14, 1993) is an American surfer.

== Early years ==
Born in Maui, Doherty was introduced to surfing early in life. Both her parents were surfers, and she grew up near a still cove, which allowed her to ride her first waves as a toddler while lying down on her dad’s board. She entered her first surfing competition at the age of seven.

== Professional career ==
On May 4, 2008, Doherty won the women’s open and junior women’s division at the Hoo-kipa Surfing Challenge Neil Pryde Maui. In August 2008, at the SIMA Surfing America USA Championships, Doherty finished fourth in the Girls Under 16 category. Her first competition outside of the U.S. was as a member of the USA Surf Team at the Quiksilver ISA World Games in April 2009, where she made it to the third round of the Girls Under 18 competition.
