= Katie Doherty =

Katie Doherty, born 1983, is a singer-songwriter based in the North East of England. In 2007 she won the Journal (Newcastle upon Tyne newspaper) Culture Award for Newcomer of the Year.

She studied music at Newcastle University which included performance time at The Sage Gateshead. Through this she was discovered by the Folkworks initiative, which has championed her work in the past few years. At the Sage, she has supported Karine Polwart, Kate & Anna McGarrigle, and Ray Davies

Doherty has also performed with fellow North Eastern musician Kathryn Tickell and recorded the song "Winter is Past" on Tickell's album Strange But True.

Her first solo album Bridges was released in October 2007, on the Park Records label.

Katie Doherty has worked as musical director for theatre productions at Newcastle's Northern Stage theatre Northern Stage theatre and the RSC RSC under the direction of Samuel West. She works regularly with November Club theatre company.

Doherty is a regular guest with folk band Broom Bezzums. She added vocal harmonies on two tracks on their 2011 album, Wine From a Mug (the title track and "Empire Windrush"). After two German tours with the band she was asked to contribute more vocal performances for the 2012 album, Winterman. On the 2015/16 release, No Smaller Than the World, Doherty contributed the song from which the album title was taken, "Passing Through", also taking on lead vocals. Her singing features on eight further songs on this album.
