= Kevin Doherty =

Kevin Doherty may refer to:

- Kevin Doherty (musician) (born late 1960s), Irish singer-songwriter
- Kevin Doherty (judoka) (born 1958), Canadian judo practitioner
- Kevin Doherty (footballer) (born 1980), Irish association football coach and former professional player
- Kevin Doherty (filmmaker), Canadian filmmaker, playwright and writer
- Kevin Doherty (politician), Canadian politician
- Kevin Doherty (American football), American football coach
- Kevin Doherty, Scottish musician known as SleepResearch_Facility

== See also ==
- Kevin Izod O'Doherty (1823–1905), Irish Australian politician
