= Bernard Doherty =

British music executive

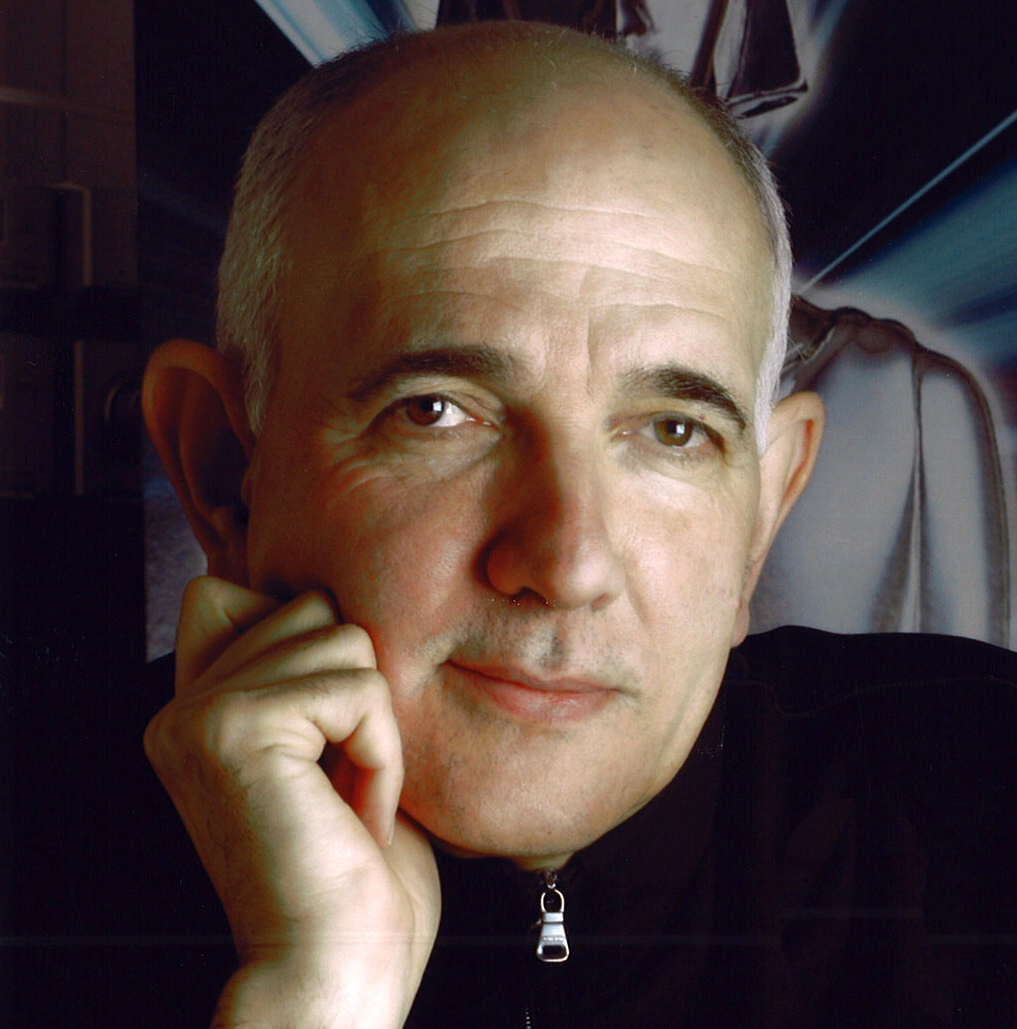
- Bernard Doherty, CEO, LD Communications Ltd
- Born: Chelmsford, Essex, England
- Occupation: Music industry public relations executive
- Known for: CEO and co-founder of LD Communications; media/PR for Live Aid and Live 8
- Awards: Record of the Day Outstanding Contribution to Music PR Award (2008); Evening Standard London's Most Influential People (2016)

Bernard Doherty (born in Chelmsford, Essex, UK) is a Public Relations executive in the Music Industry. He is the CEO & co founder of LD Communications, London. In 2008 Doherty was given the 'Outstanding Contribution to Music PR Award' by the Record of the Day, In 2016 Doherty was listed by the Evening Standard as one of London's Most Influential People.

== Early career ==
The son of a pair of ballroom dance instructors, Doherty began his music business career as a part-time enterprise as a DJ in dancehalls and pubs while still employed full-time as an electrical apprentice at Marconi Ltd in Chelmsford. A frequent visitor to Soho's Marquee Club and Flamingo Club he began working as a DJ at Basildon & Ilford Mecca ballrooms. At 19 years old he then turned professional and moved to Copenhagen and Stockholm to earn a full-time living as a club DJ.

In the early 1970s, Doherty returned to London and secured a position in the post room at Island Records before becoming a road manager for music impresario Jo Lustig, working on tours for artists including Jethro Tull, The Chieftains and Richard & Linda Thompson, Nico & Fairport Convention. In the 1979 Doherty moved to Joe Boyd's Hannibal Records independent label as a press officer.

== Live Aid ==
Doherty took charge of media for Bob Geldof's Live Aid concert in 1985. In 2005 he led public relations for the Live 8 concerts.

== Laister Dickson ==
A 1989 takeover by Shandwick Plc. shifted the focus of Rogers & Cowan away from music so in 1990 Doherty left, taking with him three clients - The Rolling Stones, Paul McCartney and Tina Turner. He joined music PR firm Laister Dickson as a director reporting to founder of the company Wendy Laister. Five years later he acquired the company and became the CEO of the renamed LD Communications Ltd.
