= Melissa Doherty =

Canadian artist

Melissa Doherty (born October 8, 1967) is a Canadian visual artist. Doherty creates aerial view landscape paintings, which give the viewer a feeling of distance from the landscape. Her work also has a three-dimensional feeling, similar to architectural models, and have been described as "still lives." She graduated from the University of Waterloo with an Honours Bachelor of Arts ( Fine Arts, Studio Specialization). Doherty has received awards from the Ontario Arts Council and Canada Council for the Arts. Her work is held in the collections of Sir Elton John and David Furnish, the University of Toronto, the Royal Bank of Canada, and the Progressive Art Collection, among others. She has exhibited across Canada and in the U.S. including the Musee des Beaux-Arts, Sherbrooke, Quebec, the University of Toronto, the Cristinerose Gallery, New York, Art Chicago, and Harbourfront Centre, Toronto.
