= Brian Doherty =

Brian Doherty may refer to:

- Brian Doherty (drummer) (active from 1981), American musician, producer, and educator
- Brian Doherty (journalist) (1968–2026), American journalist and author
- Brian Doherty (politician) (born 1957), American alderman for Chicago, former amateur boxer
- Brian Doherty (guitarist), Canadian guitarist for Big Wreck
