= Robert Doherty =

Robert Doherty may refer to:

- Bob Doherty (1891–1967), Irish hurler
- Robert E. Doherty (1885–1950), American president of Carnegie Mellon University
- Robert Doherty (rugby league) (1870–1942), English rugby player
- Robbie Doherty (born 1988), Canadian curler
- Robert J. Doherty (1924–2019), American photographer, scholar, and museum professional

== See also ==
- Robert Dougherty (disambiguation)
