= William Doherty (priest) =

William James Doherty was an Anglican priest, most notably Archdeacon of Perth, ON in the first half of the twentieth century.

Doherty was educated at Huron College and ordained deacon in 1869, and priest in 1900. He served curacies at Hensall and London. In 1920 he became Domestic Chaplain to David Williams, Bishop of Huron, who in 1922 appointed him an Archdeacon.
