= Con Doherty =

Australian rules footballer

Personal information
- Full name: Cornelius Doherty
- Born: 8 November 1884; Creswick, Victoria
- Died: 28 June 1967 (aged 82); South Melbourne, Victoria
- Original team: South Ballarat
- Height: 174 cm (5 ft 9 in)

Playing career^{1}
| Years | Club | Games (Goals) |
| 1909 | Melbourne | 1 (0) |
- ^{1} Playing statistics correct to the end of 1909.

Cornelius Doherty (8 November 1884 – 28 June 1967) was an Australian rules footballer who played with Melbourne in the Victorian Football League (VFL). He was named in the best players in his single game for the club.

== Family ==
The son of Cornelius Doherty (-1905), and Hanora Doherty (c.1845-1932), née Hurley, Cornelius Doherty was born at Creswick, Victoria on 8 November 1884.

He married Elizabeth Lee in 1913.

== Death ==
He died at his home, in South Melbourne, on 28 June 1967.
