= Eamon Doherty =

Northern Ireland footballer

Personal information
- Date of birth: 1 April 1974 (age 52)
- Place of birth: Derry, Northern Ireland
- Position: Midfielder

Senior career*
| Years | Team | Apps | (Gls) |
| ????–1997 | Coleraine | ? | |
| 1997–2005 | Derry City | 240 | (19) |
| 2006–2007 | Limavady United | 20 | (6) |
| 2007–2010 | Crusaders | 82 | (4) |
| 2010 | Crusaders | 4 | (0) |
- * Club domestic league appearances and goals

Eamon Doherty (born 4 January 1974) is a retired Irish League footballer who most recently played for Crusaders.

== Biography ==
'Doc' started his career at Coleraine, before signing for Derry City and becoming a stalwart of their midfield for many years. He then had spell at Limavady United before joining current club Crusaders. He retired at the end of the 2009/10 season, but came out of retirement to re-sign for the Crues after a player shortage. He made his 2nd debut on 25 September 2010, coming on as a substitute away to Portadown, but was forced to retire one month later, due to work commitments. He made 113 appearances for the Crues, scoring 7 goals.

== Honours ==
Derry City

- FAI Cup (1): 2002
- League of Ireland Cup (2): 1999/2000, 2005

Crusaders

- Irish Cup (1): 2008/09
- County Antrim Shield (1): 2009/10
