= Nicolaj Siggelkow =

American economist

Nicolaj Siggelkow is an American economist, currently the David M. Knott Professor at Wharton School of the University of Pennsylvania.

== Early years ==
Siggelkow grew up in Germany before making a move to the United States to pursue his undergraduate degree in economics at Stanford University, where he graduated with distinction and honors in 1993. He then went on to earn a Ph.D. in economics from Harvard University. After graduating from Harvard in 1998, Siggelkow joined Wharton School of the University of Pennsylvania as faculty.
