= Noel Doherty (footballer) =

Australian rules footballer

Personal information
- Full name: Noel Doherty
- Born: 5 August 1921
- Died: 23 October 2011 (aged 90)
- Original team: Dookie College
- Height: 178 cm (5 ft 10 in)
- Weight: 81 kg (179 lb)

Playing career^{1}
Years	Club	Games (Goals)
1943, 1945	Richmond	8 (3)
- ^{1} Playing statistics correct to the end of 1945.

Noel Doherty (5 August 1921 – 23 October 2011) was a former Australian rules footballer who played with Richmond in the Victorian Football League (VFL).
