= Neil A. Doherty =

American economist

Neil A. Doherty is an American economist, currently the Frederick H. Ecker Professor Emeritus of Insurance and Risk Management at Wharton School of the University of Pennsylvania.

== Books ==
Doherty's books include:

- Corporate Risk Management: A Financial Exposition (McGraw-Hill, 1985)
- The Financial Theory of Pricing Property-Liability Insurance Contracts (with Stephen P. D'Arcy, University of Pennsylvania, 1988)
- Integrated Risk Management: Techniques and Strategies for Reducing Risk (McGraw-Hill, 2000)
- At War With the Weather: Managing Large-Scale Risks in a New Era of Catastrophes (with Howard Kunreuther, Erwann O. Michel-Kerjan, Martin F. Grace, Robert W. Klein, and Mark V. Pauly, MIT Press, 2009)
- The Known, the Unknown, and the Unknowable in Financial Risk Management: Measurement and Theory Advancing Practice (edited with Francis X. Diebold and Richard J. Herring, Princeton University Press, 2010)
