= Robert E. Dougherty =

American basketball coach

Biographical details
- Died: September 28, 1980 (aged 64); Brigantine, New Jersey

Playing career

Men's basketball
- 1935–1938: Penn

Football
- 1935–1937: Penn

Coaching career (HC unless noted)

Men's basketball
- 1940–1945: West Catholic HS
- 1945–1946: Penn

Football
- 1940–1944: West Catholic HS

Head coaching record
- Overall: 7–10 (.412) (college basketball); 41–5–5 (.853) (high school football)

Accomplishments and honors

Championships
- As player 1x Philadelphia Catholic League football champion (1933); As coach 4x Philadelphia Catholic League football champion (1941–1944); 1x Philadelphia city football champion (1943)

Awards
- Class of 1915 Award (1938)

Robert E. Dougherty is an American basketball coach who was the head coach at the West Philadelphia Catholic High School for Boys (1940–1945) and the University of Pennsylvania (1945–1946).

== Playing ==
A native of Overbrook, Pennsylvania, Dougherty was captain of St. Joseph's Preparatory School's 1933 Philadelphia Catholic League championship football team. He played basketball and football at the University of Pennsylvania. He was captain of the Penn Quakers men's basketball team during the 1937–38 season. In 1938, he received the Class of 1915 Award, which is "presented to the male student-athlete who best exemplifies the spirit and tradition of University of Pennsylvania Athletics".

== Coaching ==
After graduating from Penn, Dougherty spent two years working for Atlantic Refining. In 1940, he became the head football and basketball coach at the West Philadelphia Catholic High School for Boys. He led the football team to four Catholic League championships (1941–1944) and a city championship in 1943. He basketball teams made the Catholic League playoffs every season he coached them, but did not capture a championship.

In 1945, Dougherty was named head men's basketball coach at Penn. He held the position on a part-time basis, also working for a Philadelphia engineering firm. He resigned after one season to focus on his business career. He was succeeded by his predecessor, Don Kellett. The Quakers went 7–10 in their only season under Dougherty.

== Death ==
Dougherty died on September 28, 1980. At the time of his death, he was residing in Brigantine, New Jersey and working as a stockbroker.
