= R. Duane Ireland =

American academic

- Born: Robert Duane Ireland; Lima, Ohio, U.S.
- Occupations: Educator, author, academic administrator

Academic background
- Education: Amarillo Junior College (AS); Texas Tech University (BBA, MBA, PhD)
- Thesis: The effect of problem solving procedure, group composition classification and locus of control orientation on idea generation performance and group participant perceived satisfaction levels (1977)
- Doctoral advisor: J. Duane Hoover
- Other advisor: Michael A. Hitt

Academic work
- Institutions: Texas Tech University; Oklahoma State University; Baylor University; University of Richmond; Texas A&M University
- Main interests: Management

Robert Duane Ireland is an American former management professor, author, and a former interim dean of Mays Business School at Texas A&M University. Ireland was acting dean of the school from January 1 to June 13, 2021, and interim dean from June 14, 2021, to August 14, 2022.

== Early life and education ==
Ireland was born in Lima, Ohio. He later moved to Amarillo, Texas, with his mother and grandmother, who both worked at the Amarillo Air Force Base.

Ireland earned an Associate in Science degree from Amarillo Junior College (A.S. 1967). He then earned his Bachelor of Business Administration (B.B.A. 1969), Master of Business Administration (M.B.A. 1971), and Doctor of Philosophy (Ph.D. 1977) degrees at Texas Tech University, where he was named a Distinguished Alumnus of the Rawls College of Business in 2018.

== Career ==
In 1977, Ireland began at Oklahoma State University as an assistant professor. He chose Oklahoma State because he wanted to join the faculty with Howard Kirk Downey, who Ireland described as a "very productive scholar", and his undergraduate advisor at Texas Tech, Michael A. Hitt. He later became an associate professor of management at Oklahoma State, where he continued teaching until 1983.

In 1983, he served as a professor of management and holder of an endowed chair at Baylor University, where he became the chair of the Department of Management in 1986 and associate dean for research in 1992. During this time he lived in Waco. He left Baylor in 2000.

From 2000 until 2004, he was a professor of management and the holder of an endowed chair at the University of Richmond.

In 2004, he became a professor at Texas A&M University. On January 1, 2021, he was appointed acting dean of Mays Business School and then interim dean on June 14, 2021. Ireland replaced the previous dean, Eli Jones. Ireland's tenure as dean was succeeded by Ricky W. Griffin, who became interim dean on August 15, 2022.

Ireland served as the 69th president of the Academy of Management in 2014.

== Personal life ==
Ireland and his family – including his wife Mary Ann and their two adult children – have endowed a $50,000 scholarship to Mays Business School.

== Publications ==
Ireland has authored or co-authored more than 20 books. The thirteenth edition of his Strategic Management: Competitiveness and Globalization appeared in 2020, and the sixth edition of Entrepreneurship: Successfully Launching New Ventures was published in 2019.

He has been published numerous articles in journals including but not limited to five Academy of Management academic journals, Strategic Management Journal, Administrative Science Quarterly, Decision Sciences, Journal of Management, Entrepreneurship Theory and Practice, Journal of Business Venturing, and Journal of Management Studies.

According to Google Scholar, Ireland has more than 300 publications that have been cited over 80,000 times, giving him an h-index of 94.

== Recognition ==
Ireland has been included on four separate occasions in the Economics and Business section of the list of "Highly Cited Researchers" (compiled by Clarivate).
