= Expectancy theory =

Psychological theory

Expectancy theory (or expectancy theory of motivation) proposes that an individual will behave or act in a certain way because they are motivated to select a specific behavior over others due to what they expect the result of that selected behavior will be. In essence, the motivation of the behavior selection is determined by the desirability of the outcome. However, at the core of the theory is the cognitive process of how an individual processes the different motivational elements. This is done before making the ultimate choice. The outcome is not the sole determining factor in making the decision of how to behave.

Expectancy theory is a motivation theory concerned with mental processes regarding choice, or choosing. First proposed by Victor Vroom of the Yale School of Management in 1964, it aims to explain the processes that an individual undergoes to make choices. In relation to the study of organizational behavior, the theory stresses "the need for organizations to relate rewards directly to performance and to ensure that the rewards provided are deserved and wanted by the recipients".

Vroom defines motivation as a process governing choices among alternative forms of voluntary activities, a process controlled by the individual. The individual makes choices based on estimates of how well the expected results of a given behavior are going to match up with or eventually lead to the desired results. Motivation is a product of the individual's expectancy that a certain effort will lead to the intended performance, the instrumentality of this performance to achieving a certain result, and the desirability of this result for the individual, known as valence.

== Author ==
In 1964, Victor H. Vroom developed the expectancy theory through his study of the motivations behind decision-making. This theory is relevant to the study of management.

== Key elements ==
The expectancy theory of motivation explains the behavioral process of why individuals choose one behavioral option over the other. This theory explains that individuals can be motivated towards goals if they believe that there is a positive correlation between efforts and performance, the outcome of a favorable performance will result in a desirable reward, a reward from a performance will satisfy an important need, and/or the outcome satisfies their need enough to make the effort worthwhile.

Vroom introduced three variables within the expectancy theory which are valence (V), expectancy (E) and instrumentality (I). The three elements are important behind choosing one element over another because they are clearly defined: effort-performance expectancy (E>P expectancy), performance-outcome expectancy (P>O expectancy).

Expectancy theory has three components:

1. Expectancy: effort → performance (E→P)
2. Instrumentality: performance → outcome (P→O)
3. Valence: V(R) outcome → reward

=== Expectancy: effort → performance (E→P) ===
Expectancy is the belief that one's effort (E) will result in attainment of desired performance (P) goals, usually based on an individual's past experience, self-confidence (self efficacy), and the perceived difficulty of the performance standard or goal.

1. Self efficacy – the person's belief about their ability to successfully perform a particular behavior. The individual will assess whether they have the required skills or knowledge desired to achieve their goals.
2. Goal difficulty – when goals are set too high or performance expectations that are made too difficult. This will most likely lead to low expectancy. This occurs when the individual believes that their desired results are unattainable.
3. Perceived control – Individuals must believe that they have some degree of control over the expected outcome. When individuals perceive that the outcome is beyond their ability to influence, expectancy, and thus motivation, is low.

=== Instrumentality: performance → outcome (P→O) ===
Instrumentality is the belief that a person will receive a reward if the performance expectation is met. This reward may present itself in the form of a pay increase, promotion, recognition or sense of accomplishment. Instrumentality is low when the reward is the same for all performances given.

Another way that instrumental outcomes work is commissions. With commissions performance is directly correlated with outcome (how much money is made). If performance is high and many goods are sold, the more money the person will make.

Factors associated with the individual's instrumentality for outcomes are trust, control and policies:

- Trusting the people who will decide who gets what outcome, based on the performance,
- Control of how the decision is made, of who gets what outcome, and
- Policies understanding of the correlation between performance and outcomes

=== Valence: Reward (R) ===
Valence is the value an individual places on the rewards of an outcome, which is based on their needs, goals, values and sources of motivation. Influential factors include one's values, needs, goals, preferences and sources that strengthen their motivation for a particular outcome.

Valence is characterized by the extent to which a person values a given outcome or reward. This is not an actual level of satisfaction rather the expected satisfaction of a particular outcome.

The valence refers to the value the individual personally places on the rewards. -1 →0→ +1

-1= avoiding the outcome 0 = indifferent to the outcome +1 = welcomes the outcome

In order for the valence to be positive, the person must prefer attaining the outcome to not attaining it.

Valence is one behavioral alternative, where the decision is measured on the value of the reward. The model below shows the direction of motivation, when behavior is energized:

Motivational Force (MF) = Expectancy x Instrumentality x Valence

When deciding among behavioral options, individuals select the option with the greatest amount of motivational force (MF).

Expectancy and instrumentality are attitudes (cognitions), whereas valence is rooted in an individual's value system.

Examples of valued outcomes in the workplace include, pay increases and bonuses, promotions, time off, new assignments, recognition, etc. If management can effectively determine what their employee values, this will allow the manager to motivate employees in order to get the highest result and effectiveness out of the workplace.

== Later research ==
=== Management ===
Victor Vroom's expectancy theory is one such management theory focused on motivation. According to Holdford and Lovelace-Elmore, Vroom asserts, "intensity of work effort depends on the perception that an individual's effort will result in a desired outcome".

In order to enhance the performance-outcome tie, managers should use systems that tie rewards very closely to performance. Managers also need to ensure that the rewards provided are deserved and wanted by the recipients. In order to improve the effort-performance tie, managers should engage in training to improve their capabilities and improve their belief that added effort will in fact lead to better performance.

- Emphasizes self-interest in the alignment of rewards with employee's wants.
- Emphasizes the connections among expected behaviors, rewards and organizational goals

Expectancy Theory, though well known in work motivation literature, is not as familiar to scholars or practitioners outside that field.

=== Computer users ===
Lori Baker-Eveleth and Robert Stone, University of Idaho in 2008 conducted an empirical study on 154 faculty members' reactions to the use of new software. It was found that ease of system use affects both self-efficacy (self-confidence) and anticipated usefulness. These in turn influenced the decision, or anticipated decision, to use the software.

Self-efficacy and outcome expectancy impact a person's affect and behavior separately:

- Self-efficacy is the belief that a person possesses the skills and abilities to successfully accomplish something.
- Outcome expectancy is the belief that when a person accomplishes the task, a desired outcome is attained.

Self-efficacy has a direct impact on outcome expectancy and has a larger effect than outcome expectancy. Employees will accept technology if they believe the technology is a benefit to them. If an employee is mandated to use the technology, the employees will use it but may feel it is not useful. On the other hand, when an employee is not mandated, the employee may be influenced by these other factors (self-confidence and confidence in outcome) that it should be used.

The self-efficacy theory can be applied to predicting and perceiving an employee's belief for computer use. This theory associates an individual's cognitive state with effective behavioral outcomes.

Other constructs of the self-efficacy theory that impact attitudes and intentions to perform are:

- past experience or mastery with the task;
- vicarious experience performing the task;
- emotional or physiological arousal regarding the task;
- social persuasion to perform the task

=== Models of teacher expectancy effects ===
Jere Brophy and Thomas Good provided a comprehensive model of how teacher expectations could influence children's achievement. Their model posits that teachers' expectations indirectly affect children's achievement: "teacher expectations could also affect student outcomes indirectly by leading to differential teacher treatment of students that would condition student attitudes, expectations, and behavior". The model includes the following sequence. Teachers form differential expectations for students early in the school year. Based on these expectations, they behave differently toward different students, and as a result of these behaviors the students begin to understand what the teacher expects from them. If students accept the teachers' expectations and behavior toward them then they will be more likely to act in ways that confirm the teacher's initial expectations. This process will ultimately affect student achievement so that teachers' initial expectancies are confirmed.

In discussing work related to this model, Brophy made several important observations about teacher expectation effects. First and foremost, he argued that most of the beliefs teachers hold about student are accurate, and so their expectations usually reflect students' actual performance levels. As a result, Brophy contended that self-fulfilling prophecy effects have relatively weak effects on student achievement, changing achievement 5% to 10%, although he did note that such effects usually are negative expectation effects rather than positive effects. Second, he pointed out that various situational and individual difference factors influence the extent to which teacher expectations will act as self-fulfilling prophecies. For instance, Brophy stated that expectancy effects may be larger in the early elementary grades, because teachers have more one-on-one interactions with students then, as they attempt to socialize children into the student role. In the upper elementary grades more whole-class teaching methods are used, which may minimize expectation effects. Some evidence supports this claim; expectancy effects in Rosenthal and Jacobson's study were strongest during the earlier grades. Raudenbush's meta-analysis of findings from different teacher expectancy studies in which expectancies were induced by giving teachers artificial information about children's intelligence showed that expectancy effects were stronger in grades 1 and 2 than in grades 3 through Grade 6, especially when the information was given to teachers during the first few weeks of school. These findings are particularly relevant because they show a form of the expectancy theory: how teachers have certain expectations of students, and how they treat the students differently because of those expectations.

== Criticisms ==
Critics of the expectancy model include Graen, Lawler and Porter. Their criticisms of the theory were based upon the expectancy model being too simplistic in nature; these critics started making adjustments to Vroom's model.

Edward Lawler claims that the simplicity of expectancy theory is deceptive because it assumes that if an employer makes a reward (such as a financial bonus or promotion) enticing enough, employees will increase their productivity to obtain the reward. However, this only works if the employees believe the reward is beneficial to their immediate needs. For example, a $2 increase in salary may not be desirable to an employee if the increase pushes him into a tax bracket in which he believes his net pay is actually reduced (a belief that is typically fallacious, especially in the United States). Similarly, a promotion that provides higher status but requires longer hours may be a deterrent to an employee who values evening and weekend time with their children.

As an additional example, if a person in the armed forces or security agencies is promoted, there is the possibility that he or she will be transferred to other locations. In such cases, if the new posting is far from their permanent residence where their family resides, they will not be motivated by such promotions and the results will backfire. As such, the reward is valued negatively to the person receiving it.

Lawler's new proposal for expectancy theory does not contradict Vroom's theory. Lawler argues that since there have been a variety of developments of expectancy theory since its creation in 1964 that the expectancy model needs to be updated. Lawler's new model is based on four claims. First, whenever there are a number of outcomes, individuals will usually have a preference among those outcomes. Second, there is a belief on the part of that individual that their action(s) will achieve the outcome they desire. Third, any desired outcome was generated by the individual's behavior. Fourth and finally, the actions generated by the individual were generated by the preferred outcome and expectation of the individual.

Instead of simply looking at expectancy and instrumentality, W.F. Maloney and J.M. McFillen found that expectancy theory could explain the motivation of those individuals who were employed by the construction industry. For instance, they used worker expectancy and worker instrumentality. Worker expectancy is when supervisors create an equal match between the worker and their job. Worker instrumentality is when an employee knows that any increase in their performance leads to achieving their goal.

In the chapter entitled "On the Origins of Expectancy Theory" published in Great Minds in Management by Ken G. Smith and Michael A. Hitt, Vroom himself agreed with some of these criticisms and stated that he felt that the theory should be expanded to include research conducted since the original publication of his book.

== Related theories ==
- Motivation Theory is a theory that attempts to explain how and why individuals are able to achieve their goals.
- Expectancy Violations Theory (EVT) is a theory that predicts communication outcomes of non-verbal communication.
- Self-Actualization Theory
- Maslow's hierarchy of needs
- Two-factor theory
- Theory X and theory Y
