= Eli Jones (academic) =

American academic

Dean of the Mays Business School at Texas A&M University
- In office June 1, 2015 – May 31, 2021
- Preceded by: Ricky W. Griffin (Interim)
- Succeeded by: R. Duane Ireland (Interim)

Dean of the Walton College of Business at the University of Arkansas
- In office 2012–2015
- Succeeded by: Matthew A. Waller

Dean of the Ourso College of Business at Louisiana State University
- In office 2008–2012

Personal details
- Born: Eli Jones III
- Spouse: Fern Walker
- Education: Texas A&M University (BA, MBA, PhD)

Eli Jones III is an academic administrator, entrepreneur, professor, business leader, corporate board member, author, and professional speaker. He is a professor of Marketing and Lowry and Peggy Mays Eminent Scholar at his alma mater, Texas A&M University. He served as a business dean for three flagship business schools, including Dean of Mays Business School at Texas A&M University for six years (from July 1, 2015, to May 31, 2021). He is the former dean of the E. J. Ourso College of Business at Louisiana State University, followed by the Sam M. Walton College of Business at the University of Arkansas.

== Early life ==
Eli Jones attended A&M Consolidated High School, and after graduation, he attended Texas A&M University. During his initial semester he was an accounting major, and after he switched to journalism. He earned a Bachelor of Arts in journalism in 1982, followed by a master in business administration in 1986 and a PhD in business administration - marketing in 1997.

== Career ==
Jones joined the University of Houston as an assistant professor, and he received tenure as an associate professor in 2002; he was a full professor from 2007 to 2008.

Jones was the dean of the E. J. Ourso College of Business at Louisiana State University from 2008 to 2012, followed by the Sam M. Walton College of Business at the University of Arkansas from 2012 to 2015. At the University of Arkansas, he was followed by Dean Matthew A. Waller. From July 2015 to May 2021, he served as the dean of the Mays Business School at his alma mater, Texas A&M University.

Jones is one of few African-American academic deans in the United States. He was inducted into The PhD Project Hall of Fame in 2016 for his sustained, unwavering commitment to achieving significant encouragement and impact within the network of minority business doctoral students and faculty.

Before becoming a professor, Jones worked in sales and sales management for three global consumer packaged goods companies. Positions held include key account manager, key account executive (responsible for two of the Top 25 supermarket chain accounts in the U.S.), zone sales planning manager (responsible for sales in three states), sales manager, and zone sales manager designate.

Jones served on the International Association to Advance Collegiate Schools of Business (AACSB) board and served on the Innovation Committee of AACSB; he also served on the board of Administaff and Insperity, and he chaired the Compensation Committee. He currently serves on the International Academy of Marketing Science Board of Governors, and he is on the funds boards of Invesco.

On June 1, 2015, Jones was appointed dean of Mays Business School. His term as dean ended on May 31, 2021. After serving as dean for six years, he returned to the school faculty in the Marketing Department as a full professor and holder of an endowed chair.

== Awards ==
Jones was also selected by his academic peers internationally for the American Marketing Association's Sales Special Interest Group's 2016 Lifetime Achievement Award for making a significant impact on sales education and research.

== Selected works ==
- Jones, Eli; Stevens, Carl; Chonko, Larry (2005). Selling ASAP: Art, Science, Agility, Performance. Cincinnati, Ohio: Thomson Learning.
- Chonko, Larry; Jones, Eli (2011). The Oxford Handbook of Strategic Sales and Sales Management. New York: Oxford University Press.
