= Merge in transit =

Merge-in-transit (MIT) is a distribution method in which several shipments from suppliers originating at different locations are consolidated into one final customer delivery. This removes the need for distribution warehouses in the supply chain, allowing customers to receive complete deliveries for their orders. Under a merge-in-transit system, merge points replace distribution warehouse. In today's global market, merge-in-transit is progressively being used in telecommunications and electronic industries. These industries are usually dynamic and flexible, in which products have been developed and changed rapidly.

== Purpose of merge-in-transit ==
Merge-in-transit allows company to assemble and transport goods simultaneously. It aims to remove the needs for distribution warehouse in the supply chain, targets at cutting down the amount of inventory stored in firm warehouses into zero, and allows customers to receive complete deliveries of their orders. Thus, transportation expenses can be lowered. From customer perspective, merge-in-transit provides value since it facilitates the delivery of a single and consolidated shipment rather than multiple smaller shipments. This also helps firms to reduce the overall inventory and process lean manufacturing.

== Methodologies of merge-in-transit ==
There are basically two ways of approaching merge-in-transit, either merging and forwarding or synchronization. Merge-in-transit depends on several factors, including the availability of multiple vendors for a customer, regularity of shipments to the customers, order size and the availability of a strategically located merge point. When these elements have been identified, a MIT operation can be created.

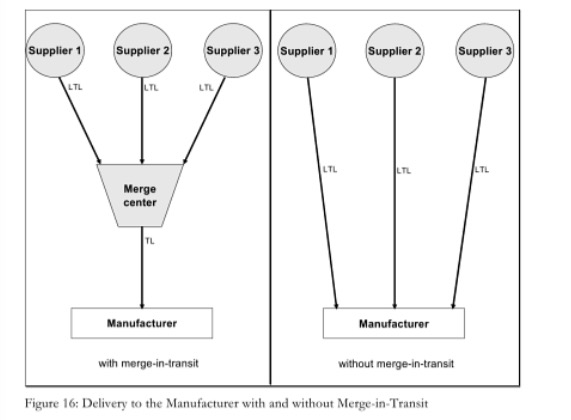
The diagram of merge-in-transit system. The graph illustrates the models with and without MIT system by highlighting the main differentiation (Merge Centre).

=== Merging and forwarding ===
A logistics company receives the goods from multiple origins, and assembles them at a single point near a customer, which is called "merge point" or "merge centre". Shippers pick up separate shipments from several suppliers and deliver them to a location near their final destination (merge points), where a merge process is being undertaken. However, no colossal inventory is stored at these merge points. This kind of just-in time sequence delivery shorten the time required to consolidate, which allows an efficient delivery to customers. For example, a company bought electronic devices from three sources in Southwest Michigan. Instead of paying for three separate lorries from Southwest Michigan to Phoenix, the three shipments can be combined in Southwest Michigan, followed by a single lorry to Phoenix.

=== Synchronization ===
Merge-in-transit can also be regarded as a synchronization of production, in which logistics and transportation operation prevents stocking of final products. Various shipments of goods will be delivered from multiple vendors, which they are all delivered to the customers at the same time. Synchronization is different from merging and forwarding, which the former neglects consolidation process.

== Advantages of merge-in-transit ==
Merge-in transit has various advantages comparing to the traditional method, which includes the following:

Increase in flexibility

Merge points can often be start-up expeditiously and cheaply, depending on the type of merge-in-transit system. MIT system simplifies the receiving and deposit processes by eliminating various shipments and receipts, making it accessible for manufacturer and supplier to work together.

Elimination of redundant transportation

The transportation time can be diminished as there are no double shipments of goods from the suppliers to the principal and the principal to the customer. Goods can be sent to the customer directly and instantly from the vendor to the customer, without the principal looking at the product.

Reduction of inventory

The most direct benefit is the reduced inventory that used to sustain the system. Many organizations target cut their inventories to zero by the replacement of merge points, whereby they no longer require warehouses to store inventory. For example, Micron technology does not store monitors or printers in their own warehouse.

Curtail transportation and administration costs

Products are handled less frequently in merge-in-transit system due to the reduction of transportation and Inventory. Receiving and storing are not required as the products do not actually go into inventory. Also, goods are delivered directly to the customer rather than the principal then to the customer. Even the locations of merge points are placed near the customer. Consequently, the transportation and inventory costs could be exceedingly low.

Heighten supply chain visibility

Manufactures can take advantages of point of sale data, forwarding the information decoupling points further back upstream and allowing deferment both in time and form. Hence, the orders and material flows are separated. These may further reduce uncertainty and cost of forecasting.

Improved customer services

Merge-in-transit enables delivery to take place more rapidly, which aids the firms to generate the ability of improving customer service. Customers have the opportunity to choose among a wider variety of products and a larger pool of suppliers due to the withdrawal of inventory and the increased flexibility. The distributor may also provide better customer service by broadening its product assortment.

Lower capital requirements

Merge-in-transit demands lesser capital investment as it does not need to store inventory in a warehouse. With regard of this, firms might spend fewer resources to deliver goods to the customer, which benefits small and medium firms with limited capital.

== Disadvantages of merge-in-transit ==
Merge-in transit has several disadvantages over the traditional way, which includes the followings.

Advanced information systems requirement

The merge-in-transit system necessitates with a considerable alteration and investment in information technology and innovation processes. These system and development do not come without corresponding investments, containing an escalation of costs that might be arduous to recover from firm's revenue.

Rise in overall cost

Merge-in-transit system involves multiple loadings and unloading of consignments. This has the potential risk of increasing the overall cost if it is not optimized correctly, which the more times consignments is transiting, the higher the cost.

Poor on-time delivery

Given that the time allowance is only a few days, in which each time period is commensurate with one day. Under merge-in-transit system, the firms will not schedule early or late arrivals to customers. They may easily impede and amend the delivery time. Hence, they have to provide compensations to the customers.

Escalate in complexity

As the requirements for coordination of orders and material flows are becoming more intensified, the complexity of distribution will be increased. Thus, firms might often create distribution problems such as sending the wrong items and out of stocks of certain products. In addition, increasing customer orders will lead to a double of time for accessible products since there are not enough stocks available, leading to the situation that the supply does not meet with the demand in the customer order cycle.

Lack of inventory

Under the merge-in-transit system, there is little or zero inventory stored in a company, which aids to cut costs. However, inventory sometimes can be regarded as an advantage. For example, if a strike occurs within the company, without the stored inventory, the company will bear risks of paying compensation or closing down by the failure in delivering customer orders on time. In this regard, reduction of inventory is detrimental to firms.

Vicious circle of delay distribution

Merge-in-transit system involves consolidated deliveries. The system relies heavily on the assumptions that the vendors will fulfill the order-filling operation at the identical level of efficiency and cooperation between vendors, which might involve risks. For example, a postponement in receiving a shipment form a vendor at the merge point would undoubtedly delay the shipment to the end of customer.

Losing brand recognition

There is a potential problem that dealer other than the organization of the brand will gain brand recognition under merge-in-transit system. Unless the products has been consolidated properly in outlook with other elements, there might be a risk that dealer might gain control of the customer for further sales. This is one of the main reasons that merge-in-transit component products gather commodities, rather than differentiated or customized products from the dealers.

== Common usage ==
Dell computers, UPS worldwide, Starbucks coffees, Cisco System, Fedex and Micron are example of companies using merge-in-transit system.

Dell Logo

=== Dell computer and UPS Worldwide ===
Dell is an American multinational computer technology organization.

United Parcel Service (UPS) is the world's largest package delivery company and a provider of supply chain management solutions.

- Dell has its own mass production unit but their monitors and keyboards are purchased from original equipment manufacturer.
- By receiving Dell's order, UPS merges the shipments of the processor, monitor, and keyboard from several origins points at one of their merge points in Reno, Louisville and Austin, then delivers the whole system to Dell.

=== Starbucks coffee ===
Starbucks is an American coffee company. It is now the largest coffeehouse company in the world.

- Through benchmarking McDonald's' new store start up techniques, they created an organized release system of the equipments and materials for their new stores five phrase.
- A system monitors the contractor's progress and determines the delivery date for each phase.
- Vendor orders are then timed to arrive at a merge points for the assembly process, then are delivered through truckloads to the store.
- MIT system has curtailed the total time for new store set-up and diminished inventory costs.

=== Cisco Systems and Fedex ===
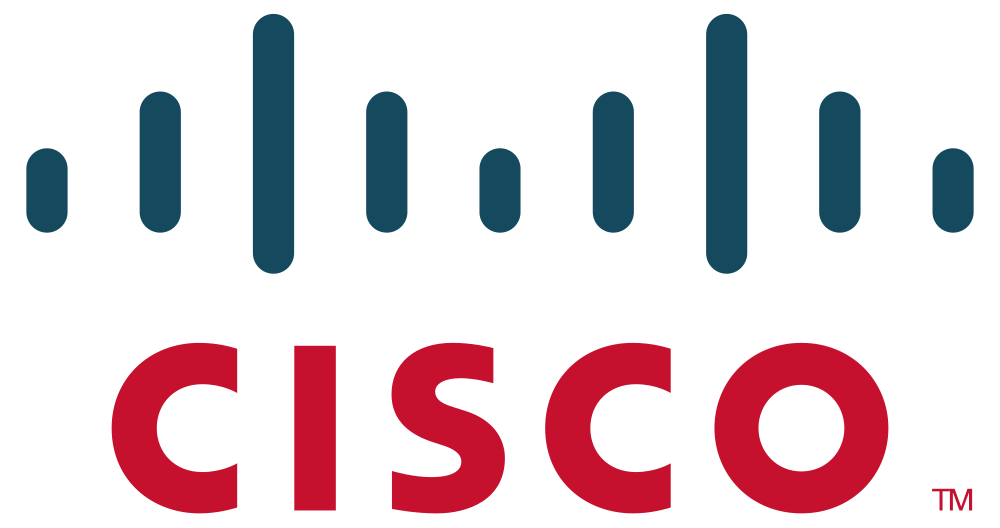
Cisco Logo

Cisco Systems is an American multinational technology company that designs, sell and manufactures networking equipment.

FedEx is an American global courier delivery services company.

- Instead of having a huge number of warehouse, the merge-in-transit system enables Cisco to match the location of the final customer with the location of the nearest FedEx storehouse where suppliers can store the components of the goods.
- The ultimate target is to have FedEx keep all the components until the customer order is complete.
- Cisco has successfully removed its stocked inventory.

=== Micron and Fedex ===
Micron Technology is an American multinational corporation, producing multiple forms of semiconductor devices, including dynamic random-access memory, flash memory, and solid-state drives.

- Micron applies merge-in-transit by employing FedEx.
- Micron produces the computer for the user based on their specific requirements. Nevertheless, computer orders basically include other accessories, for instance keyboards and monitors.
- FedEx helps Micron to stores computer accessories for Micron in their centre. Accessories are then matched up with computers on the way to the customer.
- FedEx delivers computer and accessories simultaneously to the customer.

== Other distribution alternatives ==
- Direct distribution
- Fulfillment and E-Fulfillment
- Postponement
- Repacking
- Transformational Cross Docking
- Fashion Logistics

== See also ==
- Synchronization
- Postponement
- Cross-docking
- Logistics
- Distribution (business)
