= Behavior management =

Behavioral intervention

Behavior management, similar to behavior modification, is a less-intensive form of behavior therapy. Unlike behavior modification, which focuses on changing behavior, behavior management focuses on maintaining positive habits and behaviors and reducing negative ones. Behavior management skills are especially useful for teachers and educators, healthcare workers, and those working in supported living communities. This form of management aims to help professionals oversee and guide behavior management in individuals and groups toward fulfilling, productive, and socially acceptable behaviors. Behavior management can be accomplished through modeling, rewards, or punishment.

== Research ==
Influential behavior management researchers B.F. Skinner and Carl Rogers both take different approaches to managing behavior.

Skinner claimed that anyone can manipulate behavior by identifying what a person finds rewarding. Once the rewards are known, they can be given in exchange for good behavior. Skinner called this "Positive Reinforcement Psychology."

Rogers proposed that the desire to behave appropriately must come before addressing behavioral problems. This is accomplished by teaching the individual about morality, including why one should do what is right. Rogers held that a person must have an internal awareness of right and wrong.

Many principles and techniques are the same as in behavior modification. However, they are considerably different and administered less often.

=== In the classroom ===
Behavior management is often applied by a classroom teacher as a form of behavioral engineering, in order to raise students' retention of material and produce higher yields of student work completion. This also helps to reduce classroom disruption and places more focus on building self-control and self-regulating a calm emotional state.

American education psychologist, Brophy (1986) writes:

Contemporary behavior modification approaches involve students more actively in planning and shaping their own behavior through participation in the negotiation of contracts with their teachers and through exposure to training designed to help them to monitor and evaluate their behavior more actively, to learn techniques of self-control and problem solving, and to set goals and reinforce themselves for meeting these meetings. (p. 191)

In general, behavior management strategies are effective at reducing classroom disruption. Recent efforts have focused on incorporating principles of functional assessment.

Such strategies can come from a variety of behavioral change theories, although the most common practices rely on using applied behavior analysis principles such as positive reinforcement and mild punishments (like response cost and child time-out). Behavioral practices like differential reinforcement are often used. These may be delivered in a token economy or a level system. In general, the reward component is considered effective. For example, Cotton (1988) reviewed 37 studies on tokens, praise, and other reward systems and found them to be effective in managing student classroom behavior. A comprehensive review of token procedures to match children's level of behavioral severity is found in Walker's text "The Acting Out Child."

Behavior management systems have three main parts: whole group, table group, and individual. Examples may include marble jars for the class, prize charts for tables, and a grid chart with 25 spaces for individual students. Many types of charts can be found to use in each situation.

Effective behavior management depends on using tools that are appropriate to each situation. One effective tool is the High Card/Low Card system. To use a high card, the educator or instructor uses strong intervention to address the issue. Some examples of High Cards are:

- Sending a student to the office
- Keeping a student after school hours
- Calling home to the student's parent

A Low Card approach is a less invasive way to address a behavioral issue and may include:

- Speaking to a student privately
- Making eye contact during the issue
- Changing the seating arrangement

Some student behaviors must be addressed immediately and could cause a teacher to interrupt teaching in order to resolve the issue. This is known as a direct cost situation. This typically arises in extreme behavior situations like physical disputes between students, loud outbursts in class, or disrupting the class disrespectfully.

Purkey proposed a visualization way to keep track of the methods used to manage student behavior. He called it the "Blue-card, orange-card theory". Blue cards help reinforce good behavior and ways to encourage a student. Orange cards, in contrast, are things that may be critical, discouraging, or demeaning. Some examples of blue cards might be bringing up the good things a student has done before focusing on the behavior that needs to change, therefore reminding the student that they have worth and causing them to feel encouraged. An orange card could list ways to critique a student's work in front of the class, which would lower their feelings of self-worth, providing an example of what to avoid. Teachers can be aware and provide students with required critique and feedback, while reinforcing their self-image. Purkey's theory helps teachers understand how they can edit behavioral management specifically in the classroom.

=== In supported living ===
In supported living environments, the goal of behavioral management is to promote residents' dignity by helping them attain greater independence. It is believed that greater independence will foster behavior that will help them live a more normal life than they would without the management.

It is important we first take a look at each resident's history. It is important that we evaluate the resident and their situation. To explain, many of them will have gone through an experience that may have started the behavior change in the first place. Some examples of these are child abuse, trauma, anxiety, and depression.

Once a person is in the behavior management process, caregivers will consider their behavior in order to keep accurate data of their behavior. This is so they can look back and make modifications to what they need, which may help them feel comfortable.

Each resident will be different and need a variety of attention. However, it is important to consider what will be needed in order to get to their success. The main goal of the behavior management is to address the behavior issue in order to keep them independent.

When with a resident there are a variety of behaviors you may come into contact with. You will not only need to know what to do in each situation but also how to act. Your behavior is crucial to the progress of their behavior. For example, it is important to react to their behaviors without becoming frustrated. It is essential that caregivers focus on the positive and help residents. Additionally, caregivers should refrain from hurried motions to keep residents calm. It is important that staff is properly trained and understands what to do in certain situations. However it might be necessary to redirect them to a psychologist, psychiatrist, hospital, or a behavior management center may be beneficial.

== Building prosocial behavior ==
Behavioral management principles have used reinforcement, modeling, and punishment to foster prosocial behavior. This is sometimes referred to as behavioral development, a sub-category of which is behavior analysis of child development. The "token economy" is an example of behavioral management approach that seeks to develop prosocial behavior. In this model, socially appropriate behaviors are encouraged and reinforced since these are equivalent to points that can be exchanged for rewards. Examples of situations and behaviors where tokens can be earned include attending groups, taking medication, and refraining from aggressive behaviors, among others.

Several studies have been done in this area to discover effective methods of building prosocial behavior. Midlarsky and colleagues (1973) used a combination of modeling and reinforcement to build altruistic behavior. Two studies exist in which modeling by itself did not increase prosocial behavior; however, modeling is much more effective than instruction-giving (such as "preaching"). The role of rewards has been implicated in the building of self-control and empathy. Cooperation seems particularly susceptible to rewards. Sharing is another prosocial behavior influenced by reinforcement. In a Harvard study, it was proven that acts of kindness and expressing gratitude in the classroom can cause better behavior and increased mood overall.

Reinforcement is particularly effective in the learning environment if context conditions are similar. Recent research indicates that behavioral interventions produce the most valuable results when applied during early childhood and early adolescence. Positive reinforcement motivates better than punishment. Motivation to behavior change is also less damaging to the relationship.

More controversy has arisen concerning behavior management due to the role of punishment in forming prosocial behavior. However, one study found that sharing rates of children could be increased by removing factors that caused a failure to share. The socialization process continues by peers with reinforcement and punishment playing major roles. Peers are more likely to punish cross-gender play and reinforce play specifically to gender.

Reinforcements are an attempt to change behavior, either positively or negatively. Positive reinforcement attempts to increase a behavior by adding something the target wants (e.g. awarding good behavior with a treat). Negative reinforcement is attempting to increase behavior by removing something unwanted from the target. (e.g., a child's room is messy and their mother nags them to clean it up, they will eventually try to keep it clean to stop the mother from nagging them). Punishment is trying to decrease behavior, either by using negative or positive stimuli. Positive punishment is when one adds an unwanted stimulus to decrease the target's behavior (e.g., spanking a child when they behave badly). Here, spanking is being added to decrease undesired behavior. Negative punishment is when one removes something the target enjoys or likes to decrease their undesired behavior. (e.g. a child comes home past curfew every weekend, so if their mother bans them from watching TV when they are past curfew, the child will eventually try to come home on time). This is negative punishment because the child likes to watch TV, so when the mother takes that away from them, they dislike the consequence. Thus, they will be more likely to come home in time to avoid having that privilege taken away.

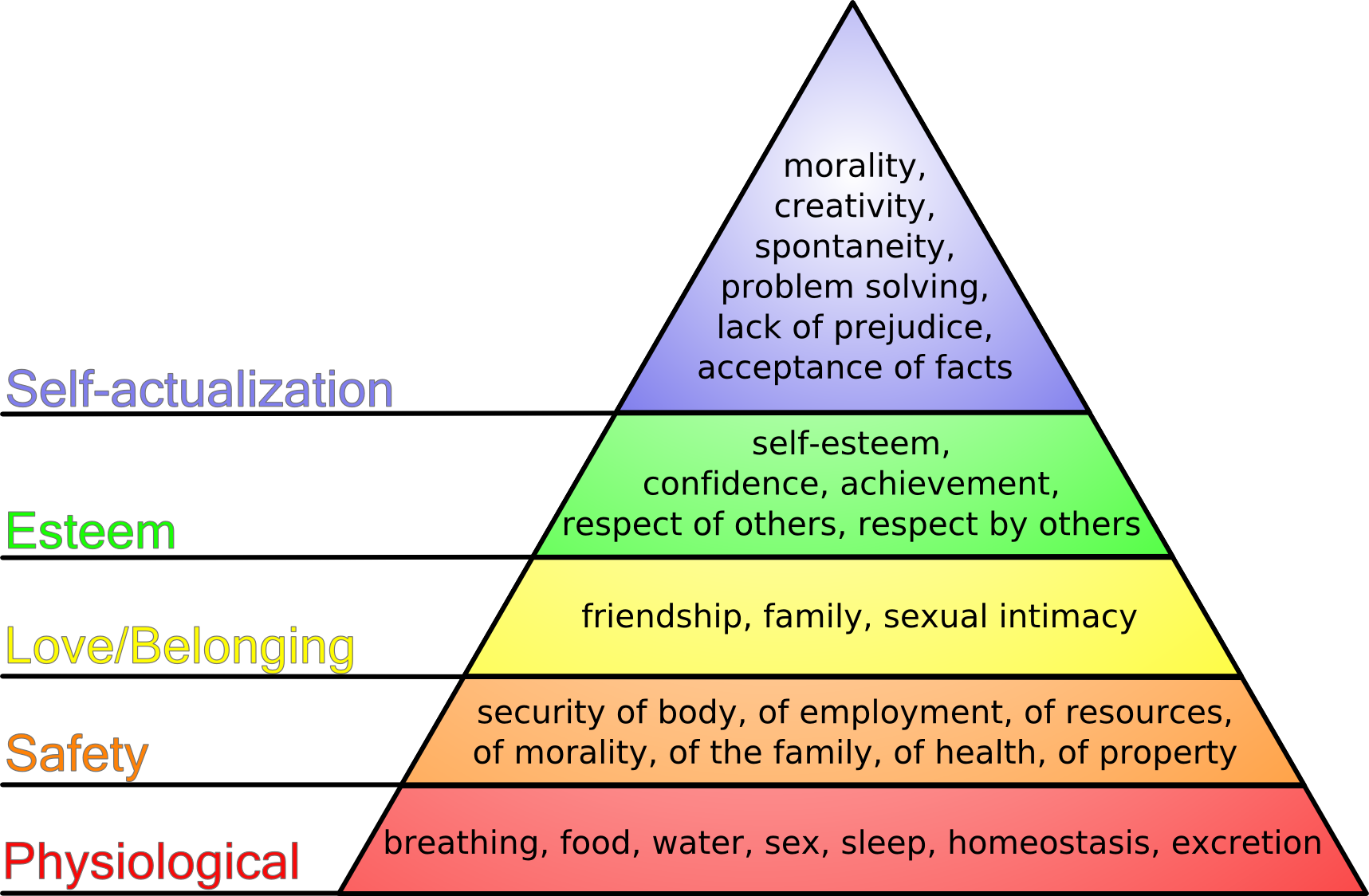
Maslow's hierarchy of needs

Abraham Maslow is a very well-known humanist psychologist, known for his work on the hierarchy of needs, in which he states that humans must have one level of needs satisfied before attaining the next level. There are five needs that are being satisfied in sequence: physiological, safety, social, esteem, and self-actualization. Maslow also claims that humans' needs are never completely fulfilled and that this affects how people behave (e.g., if a person's needs are never fully satisfied, then they might not always behave well, even if they do receive a treat for good behavior). A related concept, the "Hawthorne Effect", involves the manipulation of behavior of somebody being observed. For example, if someone is being studied in an experiment, that person might perform better or work harder because they are aware of the attention they are receiving. It is this effect of observation that is called the "Hawthorne Effect". This is interesting because if a child who is behaving very poorly, no matter what, is put in an experiment, they might increase their good behavior. After all, they are receiving attention from the researcher. The point of operant conditioning in behavior modification is to regulate the behavior. This method uses different techniques and ties them all together to monitor behavior. It can lead to problems, however, when talking about Maslow's Hierarchy of needs because in this model Maslow goes on to explain how no one's needs are fully met. The highest point on Maslow's pyramid is self-actualization which Maslow argues is the goal in which we do not reach. This can pose a problem when it comes to behavior modification because one might think if that individual can not reach that ultimate goal, why try at all. Self-actualization is the goal in which humans have this sense of belonging or accomplishment. Humans have an inherent need to achieve goals and attain self-satisfaction; when we do not attain those goals and needs, we feel dissatisfied. When a person does not meet that top goal, that person might feel a void, discouraged because they cannot seem to reach that ultimate step. Using these behavioral modifications or techniques, people can teach themselves how to better attain these goals.

== Managing defensive behavior ==
Understanding and dealing with defensiveness is an important personal skill. Following are some of the strategies:

1. Recognize that defensive behavior is normal, as "defensive behaviors are intended to reduce a perceive threat or avoid an unwanted threat," It is normal for one to be defensive when they feel that something is their fault. These actions are attempted in order to avoid blame or change of action.
2. Never attack a person's defenses. Do not try to “explain someone” to themselves by saying things like, “you know the real reason you are using that excuse is that you cannot bear to be blamed for anything.” Instead, try to concentrate on the act itself rather than on the person.
3. Postpone action. Sometimes it is best to do nothing at all. People frequently react to sudden threats by instinctively closing off and hiding their feelings. When given time the person will be able to give a more composed reaction or answer. These feelings often come from being overloaded, especially in the workplace where overload can have a taxing effect on a person's ability to meet task expectations.
4. Recognize human limitations. Do not expect to be able to solve every problem that comes up, especially the human ones. More importantly, remember that a layman should not try to be a psychologist. Offering employees understanding is one thing; trying to deal with deep psychological problems is another matter entirely.
5. Knowing personal limits and expectations is important in helping others with defensive behavior. Being able to have effective self-observation is important because if there is no solid idea of one's feelings, then trying to help others will come across as too aggressive or too reserved. A smart way to start this change is by asking oneself a couple of different questions, such as "what am I feeling", "what am I thinking", "how else can I think about that," etc. Then proceed to automatically notice if the feelings are winding up or down to act accordingly.

An effective strategy to dealing with defensiveness is the SCARF model which was developed by an Australian neuroscientist named David Rock. The five letters stand for status, certainty, autonomy, relatedness, and fairness. Understanding each domain will help explain the fight or flight response when someone is faced with a stressful situation; and focus on each individuals' skills.

Status threats relate to how important the threat is to others and ourselves, looking at how the situation will help lift or put down the other people involved and forget about ego(s).

Certainty threats deal with predicting the future such as when someone says "I never get told anything in this company." It is actually them asking to be kept in the loop about decisions that are being made.

Autonomy threats are based on the control throughout a situation; if someone is having this threat they will feel like they have not had any say or input and become frustrated as a result. In these situations, giving that person a choice is the best option.

Relatedness threats deal with how comfortable someone feels around other people. In this case, the leader of the group needs to make sure that everyone is feeling included and important. Making sure that everyone's voice is heard and they are important individuals.

Finally, the fairness threat is the perception of both parties that the exchange of content and relation is fair and equal. No one wants to feel like they are putting in 80 percent while the other side is only putting in 20 percent.
