= Walton College =

Walton College may refer to one of two colleges"

- Sam M. Walton College of Business, a business college for the University of Arkansas named after Wal-Mart founder Sam Walton.
- Okaloosa-Walton College, a community college in Niceville, Florida founded in 1963.
