= Postponement =

Business strategy

Postponement is a business strategy employed in manufacturing and supply chain management which maximizes possible benefit and minimizes risk by delaying further investment into a product or service until the last possible moment, or where a manufacturer produces a generic product, which can be modified at a later stage before the final distribution to the customer. An example of such a strategy is Dell Computers' build-to-order online store. One of the earliest references to the concept was in a paper by Walter Zinn and Donald J. Bowersox in the Journal of Business Logistics in 1988, which highlighted five types: labeling, packaging, assembly, manufacturing and time postponements.

One of the most modern definitions today is the following, suggested by Christopher (2005):

Postponement refers to the process by which the commitment of a product to its final form or location is delayed for as long as possible.

A successful example of postponement – delayed differentiation – is the use of "vanilla boxes". Semi-finished computers are stored in advance of seeing the actual demand for the finished products. Upon seeing the demand, thus with no residual uncertainty – these “vanilla boxes” are finished by adding (or removing) components. The three key interrelated decisions are: (a) how many different types of vanilla boxes to stock, (b) in what quantities, and (c) how to finish to meet the order most effectively. Another example is an umbrella manufacturer who does not know what the demand will be for different colored umbrellas. The manufacturer will manufacture all white umbrellas and dye them later when umbrellas are in season and it is easier to predict demand of each color of umbrella. This way the manufacturer can stock up on white umbrellas early with minimal labor costs, and be sure of the demand before they dedicate time and money into predicting the demand so far in the future.

== Historical development of postponement ==
According to various logistics journals, supply chain management books and articles, the postponement concept has three key dates in its development in the 20th century – 1950, 1965 and 1988:

- Marketing theorist Alderson in 1950 was the first to create the concept of postponement. He stated that it could reduce costs from a marketing point of view by postponing to as late as possible the product differentiation. The theorist believes that the closer the product is to its consumer, the more differentiated it becomes due to changes in unique tastes and demands. In this situation, both the consumer and producer benefit, as there is less risk from uncertainty for a producer leaving the consumer satisfied with a product.
- In 1965, L. P. Bucklin argued that Alderson’s interpretation needed modification, as it was still unclear how exactly postponement was applied on the channel level, namely, distribution. He explained that there is a shift of the risk to another partner in the supply chain due to postponement of the owned bunch of goods. This means that an institution involved in the chain, may it be a consumer, producer or the ones in between, have to bear the risk. In addition to this, Bucklin also claimed that inventories might be ineffective due to postponement, meaning there is no need to use forces for the stock. To solve the problem Bucklin developed the speculation concept for the aim of creating the speculation-postponement strategy. Speculation allowed for orders of large quantities of goods, which already cuts the costs in transportation and sorting. These goods are then placed into speculative inventories and emptied according to the orders. The ideal strategy would be to either use speculation or postponement in the distribution channel depending on competition and potential risk savings.
- Zinn and Bowersox in 1988 divided postponement into five different types to improve the distribution systems: four form postponements (labeling, packaging, assembly, manufacturing) and time postponement. These strategies were created with the aim to save costs, and therefore Zinn and Bowersox (1988) created a useful cost model to see how postponement affects each strategy with regards to costs.

After the development of the concept in the 20th century, researchers started defining postponement differently since 2000 and there are two key developments in 2001 and 2004. In 2001, Remko Van Hoek pointed out that it is important to analyze postponement not just on the marketing and distribution channel levels but also on the supply chain level. He argued that previous theories developed in the 20th century had gaps in their research on postponement, and identified 5 challenges: 1. Postponement as a supply chain concept, 2. Integrating related supply chain concepts, 3. Postponement in the globalizing supply chain, 4. Postponement in the customized supply chain, 5. Methodological upgrading of postponement.

In the first challenge, Van Hoek criticised Bucklin’s and Zinn’s postponement theories as lacking application throughout the whole supply chain, since they only linked their theories to one of its levels (upstream – sourcing & components, midstream - manufacturing, downstream - distribution). Professor Van Hoek states that “specific study should be undertaken to assess what extent postponement is applied at various positions in the supply chain”.

The second challenge states that to cover the entire supply chain in conceptualization of postponement, a researcher would need to engage related concepts, e.g. just-in-time manufacturing and supply, efficient consumer response.

Globalization in postponement comes as the third challenge. He states that there are differences in language, culture across the world and that postponement is widely present in Western countries rather than emerging countries in Asia. Therefore, Van Hoek advises to analyse these geographical dimensions when conducting a research on postponement.

The fourth challenge discusses lack of typology in postponement. Researches should not only pay attention to manufacturing and logistics related postponement but also to service postponement, since the concept takes its place in services too.

Finally, the fifth challenge tells that in order to conduct a solid research plan on postponement one should consider the triangulation model with first step – how postponement is implemented in a global supply chain, second step – where, to what extent and how postponement is applied, third step – benefits of postponement in the customized supply chain.

It should be stated that Van Hoek has made a solid contribution into postponement concept development as he provided these 5 challenges, and raised interest on postponement, i.e. there has been more literature on postponement available.

Yang et al. (2004) arranged the Zinn and Bowersox postponement strategies into more accurate groups and explained how exactly the strategy is matched to a type of postponement.

Yang et al. stated that in order to cope with high level of uncertainty, purchasing postponement (purchasing materials as close to production as possible) product development postponement may be applied => no physical inventory. In contrast, to deal with low uncertainty we use logistics postponement (reduction of obsolete inventories, just-in-time delivery) and production postponement => semi-finished product. With high modularity (when components can be incorporated into products with almost no change) product development and production postponements are used, whereas with low modularity (when customization is required) – logistics and purchasing postponements. This is what exactly was lacking in the 20th century because you did not know whether physical inventory, semi-finished, or finished products would work best as it was uncertain due to fluctuating consumer demands. Therefore, Yang et al. provides us with a guideline on how to manage this uncertainty.

== Terminology ==
Thacker uses the term "point(s) of mutation" to refer to the potentially postponable stages in a production process when products become more specialised.

== See also ==
- Procrastination
