= Journal of Business Logistics =

- Discipline: Business logistics, supply chain management, business
- Language: English
- Edited by: Terry Esper, Christian Hofer, Rodney Thomas

Publication details
- History: 1979–present
- Publisher: Wiley-Blackwell on behalf of the Council of Supply Chain Management Professionals
- Frequency: Quarterly
- Impact factor: 6.677 (2020)

Standard abbreviations
- ISO 4: J. Bus. Logist.

Indexing
- ISSN: 0735-3766 (print); 2158-1592 (web)
- OCLC no.: 183389378

Links
- Journal homepage; Online access; Online archive

The Journal of Business Logistics is a peer-reviewed academic journal published by Wiley-Blackwell on behalf of the Council of Supply Chain Management Professionals (CSCMP), covering research and best practices in logistics and supply chain management. In October 2025, Terry Esper The Ohio State University Fischer College of Business, Christian Hofer University of Arkansas Sam M. Walton College of Business, and Rodney Thomas University of Arkansas Sam M. Walton College of Business were appointed as the incoming editors-in-chief, taking over from Glenn Richey and Beth-Davis-Sramek (both of Auburn University). According to the Journal Citation Reports, its 2020 impact factor is 6.677 and its 5-year impact factor is 7.362, ranking it 48th out of 226 journals in the category "Management".

== Notable articles ==
Highly cited and influential articles include:

- An Empirical Examination of Supply Chain Performance Along Several Dimensions of Risk (2008) by Wagner, Stephan M.; Bode, Christoph
- Global Supply Chain Risk Management (2008) by Manuj, Ila; Mentzer, John T.
- Supply Chain Capital: The Impact of Structural and Relational Linkages on Firm Execution and Innovation (2008) by Autry, Chad W.; Griffis, Stanley E.
- Mapping the Landscape of Future Research Themes in Supply Chain Management (2016) by Wieland, Andreas; Handfield, Robert B.; Durach, Christian F.
- Crowdsourcing Last Mile Delivery: Strategic Implications and Future Research Directions (2018) by Castillo, Vincent E.; Rose, William J.; Rodrigues, Alexandre M.
- The Evolution of Resilience in Supply Chain Management: A Retrospective on Ensuring Supply Chain Resilience (2019) by Pettit, Timothy J.; Croxton, Keely L.; Fiksel, Joseph

== Past Editors-in-Chief ==
- 2020 to 2025: Robert "Glenn" Richey, Jr. and Beth Davis-Sramek (Auburn University)
- 2015 to 2020: Thomas J. Goldsby (University of Tennessee-Knoxville) and Walter Zinn (Ohio State University)
- 2010 to 2015: Stanley E. Fawcett (Weber State University) and Matthew A. Waller (University of Arkansas)
- 2005 to 2010: James R. Stock (University of South Florida)
- 2001 to 2005: Patricia J. Daugherty (Iowa State University)

== Awards ==
The "Bernard La Londe Best Paper Award" is presented annually at the Academic Research Symposium held at the CSCMP EDGE Conference to the best paper published in the journal.
