= Patricia Daugherty =

American management scientist

Patricia Joan Daugherty is a retired American management scientist specializing in logistics, supply chains, and cooperation. She has been Siegfried Chair in Marketing at the University of Oklahoma, Bowersox–Thull Chair in Logistics and Supply Chain Management at Michigan State University, and Debbie and Jerry Ivy Chair in Business at Iowa State University.

== Education and career ==
Daughterty studied marketing and business at Western Michigan University, graduating in 1980 and earning an M.B.A. in 1981. She stayed at Western Michigan University as an instructor in marketing from 1983 to 1985 before completing a Ph.D. in marketing in 1988 at Michigan State University.

After postdoctoral research at Michigan State University, she became an assistant professor of marketing and distribution at the University of Georgia in 1989, and was promoted to associate professor in 1995. She moved to the University of Oklahoma as Siegfried Chair in 1997, and was promoted to full professor there in 1999. In 2012 she moved to Michigan State University as Bowersox–Thull Chair in Logistics and Supply Chain Management, and in 2017 she moved again to Iowa State University as Debbie and Jerry Ivy Chair in Business and professor of supply chain management.

She was editor-in-chief of the Journal of Business Logistics from 2001 to 2005. She retired in 2022.

== Recognition ==
The Western Michigan University Haworth College of Business has named Daugherty to their alumni hall of fame.
