= Mary Lacity =

Blockchain researcher

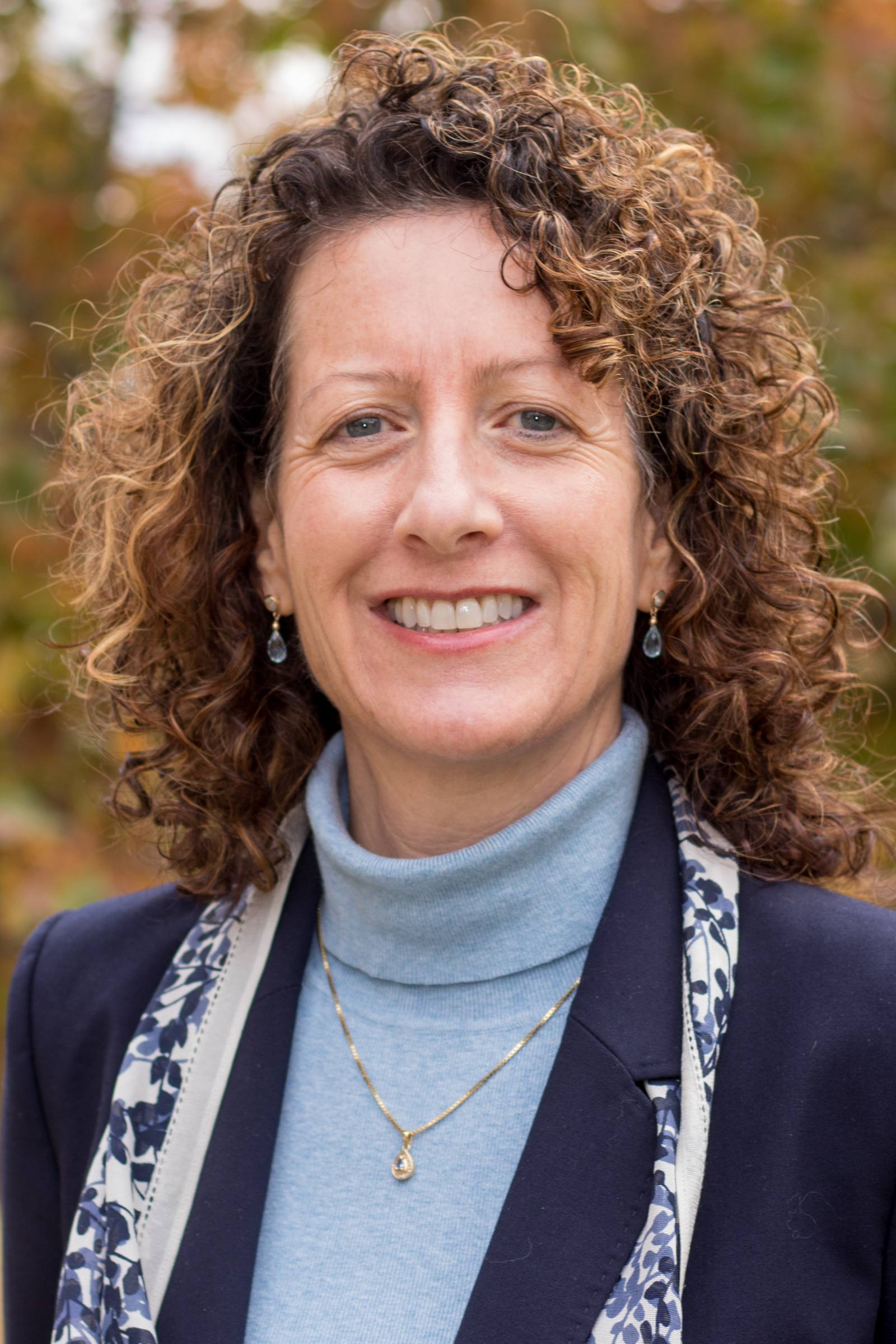
- Born: May 27, 1963 (age 63); Atlantic City, New Jersey
- Education: University of Houston
- Occupations: David D. Glass Chair and distinguished professor of Information Systems
- Employer(s): University of Arkansas; London School of Economics; Washington University; University of Oxford
- Known for: Automation, Blockchain and Outsourcing Research

Mary Cecilia Lacity (born May 27, 1963)^{[1]} is a David D. Glass Chair and a distinguished professor of Information Systems at the University of Arkansas, Sam M. Walton College of Business.

Lacity was previously the Curators' Distinguished Professor of Information Systems and International Business Fellow at the University of Missouri–St. Louis. She also held the position of visiting scholar at the MIT Center for Information Systems Research. Additionally, she has held visiting positions at the London School of Economics, Washington University in St. Louis, and University of Oxford. Her research is in automation, outsourcing and blockchain.

== Early life ==
Born in Atlantic City, New Jersey, Lacity received her undergraduate degree in Quantitative Business Analysis at Pennsylvania State University in 1985. Before receiving her PhD, she was a consultant for Technology Partners International and a systems' analyst for Exxon. In 1992, she received her Ph.D. in Information Systems from the University of Houston, C.T. Bauer College of Business.

== Career ==
=== University of Missouri-St. Louis ===
Lacity started at the University of Missouri–St. Louis in 1992, and was there for 26 years. Starting as an Assistant Professor of MIS, she moved to associate professor in 1998 and full professor in 2004. In 1996, she testified on behalf of the Civil Service Employees Association of Westchester County, New York, in opposition to county efforts to privatize computer systems. In the early 2000s, she worked with Leslie Willcocks of the London School of Economics in the research of outsourcing of information management. In 2012, Lacity became the Curators' Distinguished Professor of Information Systems, and International Business Fellow. She taught classes on Qualitative Research Methods and The Philosophy of Science and Qualitative Research Methods.

=== Sam M. Walton College of Business ===
After her time at the University of Missouri-St. Louis, Lacity moved to Fayetteville, Arkansas, to become a Walton Professor of Information Systems.^{[11]} She also served as the Director of the Blockchain Center of Excellence for five years.

=== Other roles ===
Lacity has served various additional roles in her career. She held the position of visiting scholar at the MIT Center for Information Systems Research. Additionally, she has held visiting positions at the London School of Economics, Washington University in St. Louis, and University of Oxford. She is also a Certified Outsourcing Professional. She is a coeditor of the Palgrave Series: Work, Technology, and Globalization, senior editor of MIS Quarterly Executive and Journal of Information Technology Teaching Cases, and on the editorial boards for the Journal of Information Technology, the Journal of Strategic Information Systems, Contributing Editor for Journal of the British Blockchain Association.

Lacity is a member of the IAOP Outsourcing Hall of Fame, and received the 2000 World Outsourcing Achievement Award and 2008 Gateway to Innovation Award. Her publications have appeared in Harvard Business Review, Sloan Management Review, MIS Quarterly, IEEE Computer, and Communications of the ACM.

In 2020, Lacity became a Fellow of the Association for Information Systems. The AIS Fellow Award recognizes individuals who have made outstanding contributions to the information systems discipline in terms of research, teaching and service. She is also a Fellow of the British Blockchain Association.

== Books ==
- Information Systems Outsourcing: Myths, Metaphors and Realities (1993) ISBN 9780471956044
- Beyond The Information Systems Outsourcing Bandwagon: The Insourcing Response (1995) ISBN 9780471958222
- Inside Information Technology Outsourcing: A State-of-the-art Report (2000) ISBN 9781873955079
- Global Information Technology Outsourcing: In Search of Business Advantage (2001) ISBN 9780471899594
- Netsourcing: Renting Business Applications and Services Over a Network (2002) ISBN 0130923559
- Outsourcing: All You Need to Know (2004) ISBN 9780992343613
- Information Systems and Outsourcing (2008) ISBN 9781349302000
- Information Systems and Outsourcing: Studies in Theory and Practice (2008) ISBN 9780230594838
- Offshore Outsourcing of It Work (2008) ISBN 9780230521858
- The Practice of Outsourcing: From Information Systems to BPO and Offshoring (2009) ISBN 9780230205413
- Emerging ITO and BPO Markets: Rural Sourcing and Impact Sourcing (2012) ISBN 9780769549187
- The Rise of Legal Services Outsourcing: Risk and Opportunity (2014) ISBN 9781472906403
- South Africa’s BPO Service Advantage: Becoming Strategic in the Global Marketplace (2015) ISBN 9781137474056
- Nine Keys to World-Class Business Process Outsourcing (2015) ISBN 9781472918482
- Service Automation: Robots and the Future of Work (2016) ISBN 9780956414564
- Robotic Process Automation and Risk Mitigation: The Definitive Guide (2017) ISBN 9780995682030
- Robotic Process and Cognitive Automation (2018) ISBN 9780995682016
- A Manager's Guide to Blockchains for Business (2018) ISBN 9780995682047
- Becoming Strategic with Robotic Process Automation (2019) ISBN 9780995682054
- Blockchain Foundations For the Internet of Value (2020) ISBN 9781682261576, 9781610757454
- Lacity, M., and Lupien, S. (2022). Blockchain Fundamentals for Web 3.0. Epic Books/University of Arkansas Press, Fayetteville Arkansas. ISBN 978-1-68226-225-2
- Lacity, M. and Treiblmaier, H. (editors) (2022). Blockchains and the Token Economy: Theory and Practice, Palgrave Macmillan, London. ISBN 978-3-030-95107-8
