= John Thomas Mentzer =

Marketing and logistics academic

John Thomas (Tom) Mentzer
- Born: December 7, 1951; Harpers Ferry, West Virginia
- Died: 26 February 2010 (aged 58)
- Education: Kettering University Michigan State
- Occupations: Writer, academic, consultant
- Spouse: Brenda Mentzer
- Children: Ashley L. Mentzer, Erin B. Mentzer
- Writing career
- Genre: non-fiction

John Thomas Mentzer (December 7, 1951 – February 26, 2010 ) was a University of Tennessee marketing and logistics professor and author.

== Life and career ==
John T. (Tom) Mentzer was born on December 7, 1951, in Harpers Ferry, West Virginia. He graduated with a bachelor's degree in industrial administration from the General Motors Institute, now Kettering University. He continued his studies at Michigan State University, graduating with an MBA and a Ph.D. After completing his studies, Mentzer worked for General Motors and then took a position at Virginia Polytechnic Institute (Virginia Tech) in Blacksburg, Virginia, where he stayed for 17 years. In 1994, he accepted a position at the University of Tennessee, where he was appointed as the Harry and Vivienne Bruce Chair of Excellence in Business. While at Tennessee, he was also appointed as a Chancellor's Professor. He served as president of the Council of Logistics Management, president of the Academy of Marketing Science and executive director of the UT Demand and Supply Integration Forums. He wrote prolifically on marketing and supply chain management, publishing numerous articles and papers and eight books. He also served as editor of the Systems Section of the Journal of Business Logistics and worked on a number of boards and committees.

Mentzer received awards including the Academy of Marketing Science Outstanding Marketing Teacher Award in 2001, the Armitage Medal of the International Society of Logistics Engineers, the Council of Logistics Management's Distinguished Service Award in 2004 and the Berkman Distinguished Service Award for service to the Academy of Marketing Science in 2008.

Mentzer died of melanoma at the age of 58. He was survived by his wife, Brenda and two daughters (Ashley and Erin).

== Books ==
Mentzer's book length publications include:

- Marketing Today, 4th Edition (1985)
- Sales Forecasting Management: Understanding the Techniques, Systems and Management of the Sales Forecasting Process (1998)
- Supply Chain Management (2000)
- Fundamentals of Supply Chain Management: Twelve Drivers of Competitive Advantage (2004)
- Sales Forecasting Management: A Demand Management Approach (2004)
- Handbook of Global Supply Chain Management (2006)
- New Supply Chain Agenda: The 5 Steps That Drive Real Value (2010)
