= Leslie Willcocks =

Leslie P. Willcocks is a Professor of Technology Work and Globalization and governor of the Information Systems and Innovation Group at the London School of Economics. He is considered an authority in the field of Outsourcing and recipient of the PricewaterhouseCoopers/Michael Corbett Associates World Outsourcing Achievement Award for his contribution to the field.

In the early 2000s, Willcocks worked with Mary Lacity, then at the University of Missouri–St. Louis, in the research of outsourcing of information management.

== See also ==
- Frank Land
