= Jere Brophy =

American psychologist

Jere Edward Brophy (June 11, 1940 – October 16, 2009) was an American educational psychologist and University Distinguished Professor of Teacher Education at Michigan State University. He received the E. L. Thorndike Award in 2007.

== Life and career ==
Brophy was born in Chicago, Illinois. After obtaining his Ph.D. in 1967 from the University of Chicago, he spent additional eight year at the University of Texas before joining Michigan State University faculty in 1976 as professor and senior researcher in the Institute of Research on Teaching. He then served as co-director of the Institute of Research on Teaching from 1981 to 1994 and then began attending the American Educational Research Association meetings.

Brophy was an Elected Fellow of the American Educational Research Association, the American Psychological Association, the American Psychological Society, and the International Academy of Education. He also was a Fellow of the Center for Advanced Study in the Behavioral Sciences, was elected into the National Academy of Education, and was a recipient of an honorary degree from the University of Liège, Belgium in 2004.

Brophy married Arlene in 1963 whom he met at the Marillac Social Center in Chicago.

Brophy died in Okemos, Michigan in October 2009 at the age of 69.

== See also ==
- Expectancy theory
