= Remko Van Hoek =

American academic

Dr. Remko Van Hoek
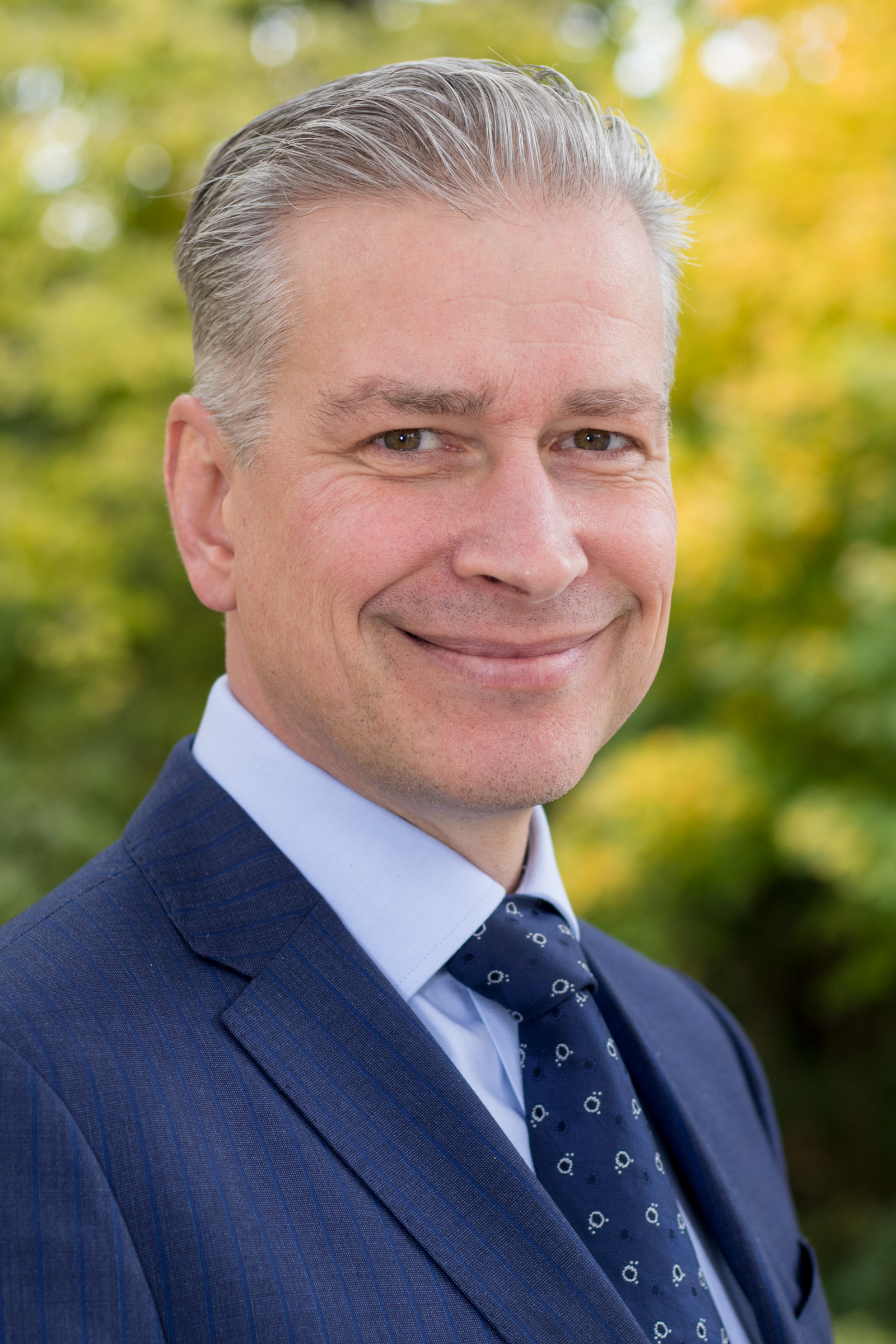
- Born: 1971 (age 54–55); IJmuiden, Netherlands
- Education: PhD in International Economics
- Alma mater: Utrecht University
- Occupation: Professor of Supply Chain at Sam M. Walton College of Business
- Employer: University of Arkansas
- Known for: Supply Chain Research

Remko I. Van Hoek (born 1971) is a professor of Supply Chain Management in the Sam M. Walton College of Business at the University of Arkansas. He has held several executive roles including positions at Disney and PwC. He is also a fellow of the Chartered Institute of Procurement & Supply and the Chartered Institute of Logistics and Transport.

== Career ==
=== Sam M. Walton College of Business ===
Van Hoek is a clinical full professor of Supply Chain management at the University of Arkansas in the Sam M. Walton College of Business. He took this position in January 2018. Van Hoek conducts research about procurement strategy. He focuses on innovation on the supply-side, buyer-seller relations, procurement development and developing supply-chain leaders.

=== Cranfield School of Management ===
Van Hoek was a visiting professor at the Cranfield School of Management in Cranfield, England. He was in this role from 1999-2019, when he wrote multiple books and taught many executive education programs. His research has won him an E. Grosvenor Plowman Award. He has been published in Harvard Business Review for his research on procurement.

=== Other roles ===
He was also a Senior Vice President of Sourcing and Procurement at the Walt Disney Company. He has been a member of many editorial advisory boards for international journals in the supply-chain management field. Remko also served as the 2018 Chairman of the Board of Directors of the Council for Supply Chain Management Professionals in the U.S. Remko was the keynote speaker at the Procurement Summit in the U.K. and has done keynotes around the world including in Singapore, Finland, and the United Kingdom. He has served many supply chain executive roles in Europe and the United States including Nike, Cofely and PricewaterhouseCoopers.

== Books ==
- Leading Procurement Strategy: Driving Value Through the Supply Chain (2014) ISBN 978-0749481643
- Logistics Management and Strategy 5th edition: Competing through the Supply Chain (2002) ISBN 978-1292004150
- Logistics Management and Strategy: Competing Through The Supply Chain (2011) ISBN 978-0273730224
- Postponed Manufacturing in European Supply Chains: A Triangular Approach (1998) ISBN 978-9068092592
