= Matthew A. Waller =

University administrator

Dr. Matt Waller
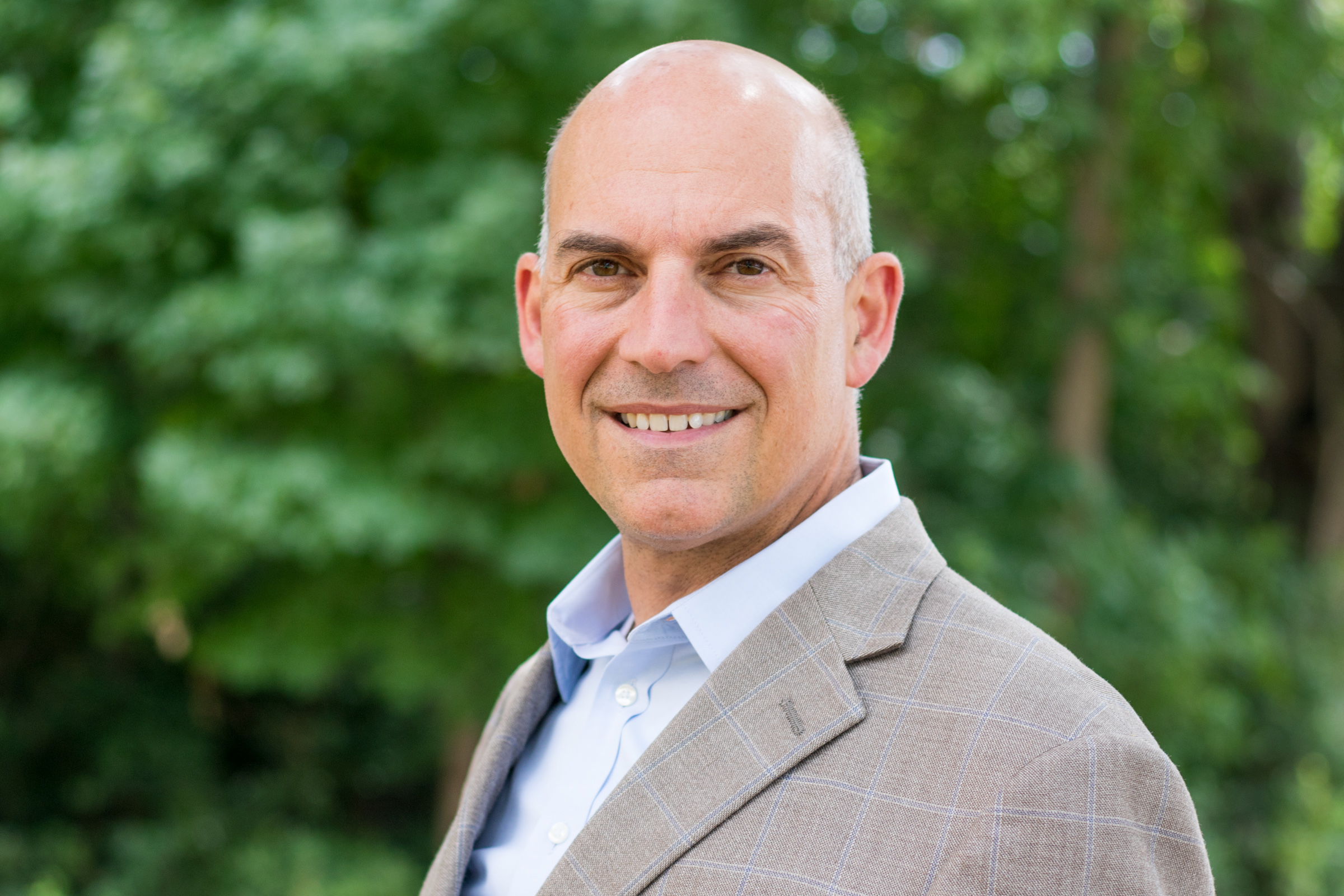
- Born: Matthew Alan Waller; August 18, 1964 (age 61); Mission, Kansas
- Education: Business (B.S) Business (M.S) Business (Ph.D)
- Alma mater: University of Missouri; Pennsylvania State University
- Occupations: Former Dean of Sam M. Walton College of Business; Professor of Supply Chain
- Employer: University of Arkansas
- Known for: Supply Chain Research
- Spouse: Susanne Waller

Matthew Alan Waller (born August 18, 1964) is the ex-dean of the Sam M. Walton College of Business at the University of Arkansas. He currently holds the Sam M. Walton Leadership Chair.

== Career ==
Waller first began his career as a visiting assistant professor at the University of Arkansas in 1994. He was named a full professor in 2007, and has been the dean of the college since May 1, 2016. He first held the chair of the Department of Supply Chain in 2011. He also held the Garrison Endowed Chair in Supply Chain Management.

Waller graduated summa cum laude with a B.S.B.A from the University of Missouri, and received an M.S. and Ph.D. from Pennsylvania State University. He is the author of The Definitive Guide to Inventory Management: Principles and Strategies for the Efficient Flow of Inventory across the Supply Chain.

Waller co-founded Bentonville Associates Ventures in 1996 and was chief strategy officer and co-founder of Mecari Technologies from 1998-2002. He is immediate past editor of the Journal of Business Logistics, and was co-Editor-In-Chief from 2011-2015. His opinion pieces have appeared in Wall Street Journal Asia and Financial Times.

He is on the Transformation Advisory Board created by Governor Asa Hutchinson in February 2017 and the Board of Advisors of the World Trade Center Arkansas.
