= Sam M. Walton College of Business =

Business school of the University of Arkansas

- Type: Public
- Established: 1926
- Parent institution: University of Arkansas
- Dean: Brent D. Williams
- Faculty: 265
- Undergraduates: 9,164
- Postgraduates: 690
- Location: Fayetteville, Arkansas, U.S. 36°03′55″N 94°10′28″W
- Website: walton.uark.edu

The Sam M. Walton College of Business (Walton College or Walton) is the business school at the University of Arkansas, a public research university in Fayetteville, Arkansas. Created in 1926, the college is the largest college at the University of Arkansas, serving nearly 10,000 students. Walton College offers undergraduate, master's, executive education, and doctoral programs and is known nationally for its strong programs in retail, entrepreneurship, information systems, and supply chain management. U.S. News & World Report consistently ranks Walton College among the top business schools in the country. The college has a close relationship with Walmart Stores, Inc., based in nearby Bentonville, Arkansas, and related vendor community.

== History ==
The School of Business Administration was founded in 1926 by Harvard graduate Charles C. Fichtner, who became the college's first dean. The original curricula covered accounting, banking, finance, general business, industrial management, and marketing. The college gained accreditation from the Association to Advance Collegiate Schools of Business, also known as AACSB International, in 1931.

A $100,000 donation from business owner Barney Lewis, class of 1934, helped establish a professional development program at the college that would later become the Leadership Walton program. In 1996, the Donald W. Reynolds Foundation gifted the college $6.7 million, which funded the Reynolds Center for Enterprise Development.

=== Eponym ===
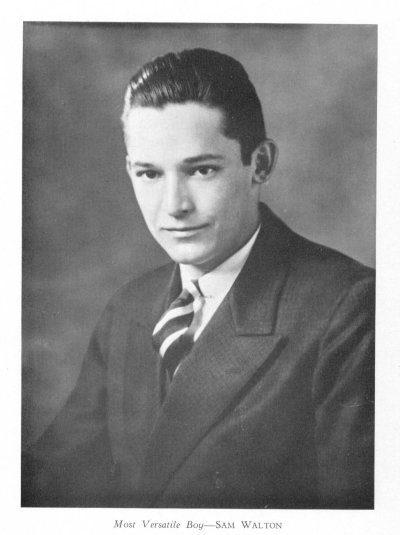
Sam Walton in 1936

The college is named after the founder of Walmart Stores, Inc., Sam Walton, when in October 1998, the Walton Family Charitable Support Foundation made a $50 million upfront cash gift. The company is headquartered in nearby Bentonville, Arkansas, and employs hundreds of Walton College graduates. This was the largest ever given to a public business college at the time. This established the "Sam M. Walton College of Business Administration", but the name was shorted to the "Sam M. Walton College of Business" in 2000.

Walmart's Live Better U education program offers free tuition and books for Walmart associates looking to earn undergraduate degrees in supply chain management, marketing and general business from Walton College.

=== Leadership ===
The College of Business has had 10 deans since 1926, and two interim deans.

- Charles C. Fichtner (1926–1940)
- Karl M. Scott (1941–1943)
- Paul W. Milam (1944–1966)
- Acting Dean Merwyn G. Bridenstine (1966–1967)
- John P. Owen (1967–1983)
- Lloyd Seaton (1983–1989)
- Stan Smith (1989–1992)
- Interim Dean Thomas McKinnon (1992–1993)
- Doyle Z. Williams (1993–2005)
- Dan L. Worrell (2005–2012)
- Eli Jones (2012–2015)
- Matthew A. Waller (2015 to 2023)
- Brent Williams (Interim Dean August 2023, named as Dean January 2024)

== Departments ==
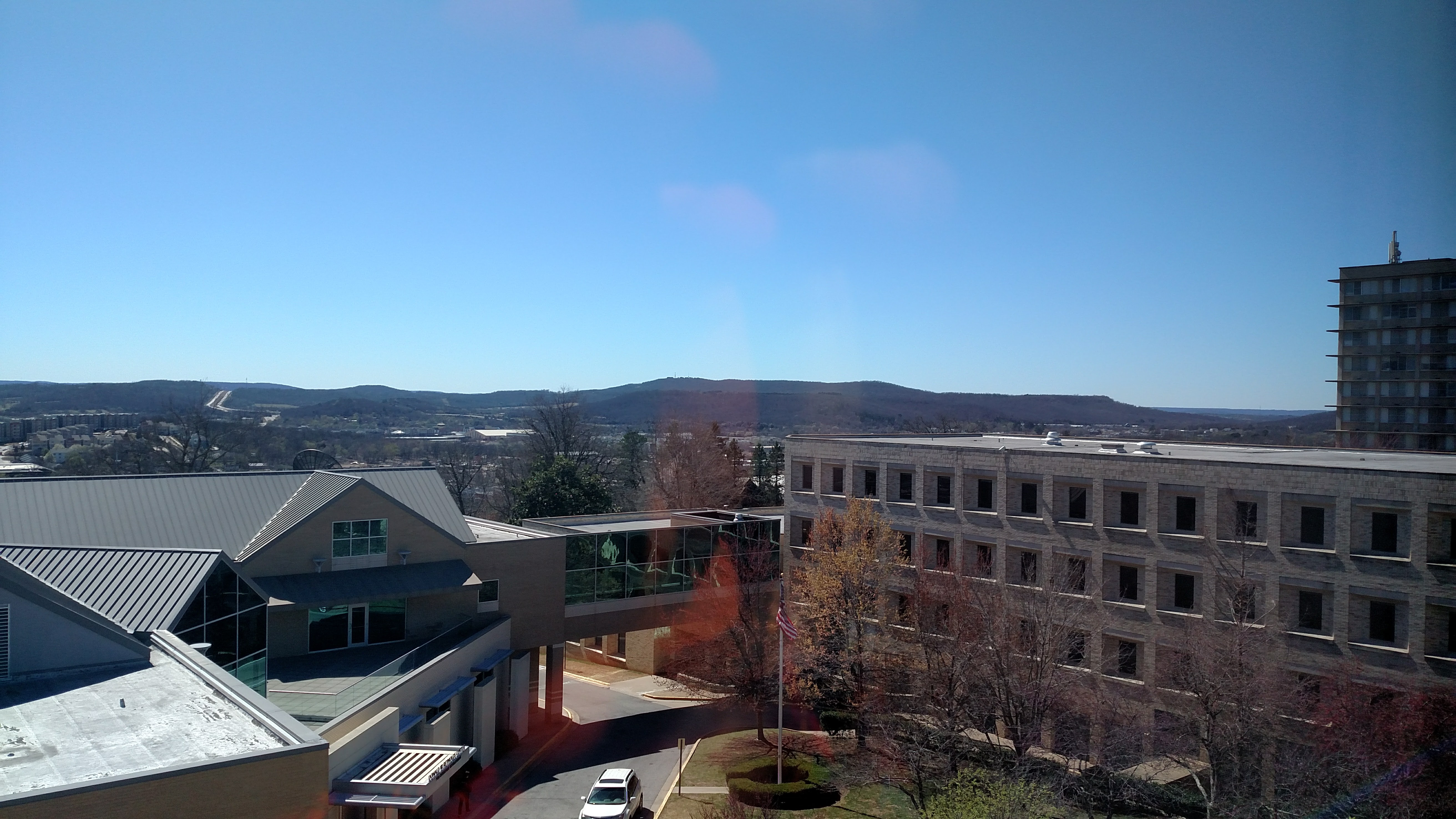
Two Walton College buildings, with the Ozark Mountains in the background

- Department of Accounting
- Department of Economics
- Department of Finance
- Department of Information Systems
- Department of Management
- Department of Marketing
- Department of Strategy, Entrepreneurship, & Venture Innovation
- Department of Supply Chain Management

== Rankings ==
U.S. News & World Report has ranked Walton College’s undergraduate business program in the top 30 public business schools for 23 consecutive years. The undergraduate program ranks #25 among public colleges and #40 overall. The online business program is ranked #8 nationally out of 214 institutions.

The Walton M.B.A. program is ranked #22 among public colleges and #48 overall by U.S. News & World Report. The Princeton Review lists the Walton M.B.A. among the best M.B.A. programs in the country, along with ranking Walton College of Business #3 in the South and #20 in the nation for best graduate entrepreneurship programs. The Wall Street Journal ranked the Walton M.B.A. #11 for the best return on investment based on federal student loan and post-graduation salary data from 600 M.B.A. programs.

The J.B. Hunt Transport Department of Supply Chain Management at Walton College is also frequently recognized for its elite Supply Chain Management programs. Gartner, the leading global research and consulting firm, has ranked Walton’s undergraduate Supply Chain Management program #1 and the graduate program #2 in North America for three consecutive ranking cycles. U.S. News & World Report ranks the undergraduate program #9 and the graduate program #11 nationally. For the sixth straight year, the department was ranked #5 in empirical supply chain research by The SCM Journal List.

Additionally, U.S. News & World Report ranks Walton College's undergraduate Management Information Systems program #14 among public colleges and #18 nationally. Walton's Department of Information Systems is consistently ranked among the top 5 in the world based on publications in premier IS journals.

== Leadership Initiatives ==
In 2020, Walton College created two leadership initiatives geared toward ethics and the customer experience.

- Business Integrity Leadership Initiative - founded by Cindy Moehring
- Customer Centric Leadership Initiative - founded by Andrew L. Murray

== Facilities ==
Business education at the University of Arkansas began on the third floor Old Main in 1926. Known as the School of Business Administration, four faculty and 21 students began business education at UA. In 1928, the school moved to the former engineering building, which was renamed the Commerce Building.

The College moved to its present location at 220 North McIlroy in 1978 following the completion of the Business Building. It was renamed to Sam M. Walton College of Business Administration following a $50 million donation from the Walton Family Charitable Support Foundation in 1998. The Donald W. Reynolds Center for Enterprise Development at 145 North Buchanan was built following a grant from Donald W. Reynolds Foundation in 1996.

Following the Campaign for the 21st Century, the Walton College saw a period of rapid facility growth. Willard J. Walker Hall at 191 North Harmon and the J.B. Hunt Transport Services Center for Academic Excellence at 227 North Harmon opened in 2007 adjacent to the Business Building, enclosing the Linda Sue Shollmier Plaza and creating a business campus within the southern part of the UA campus. The McMillon Innovation Studio, named for alumnus Doug McMillon, was opened in a former retail space at 146 North Harmon near the other business buildings in 2016.

A gallery, with dates used by the College of Business in parentheses, shows the facilities used throughout the years.

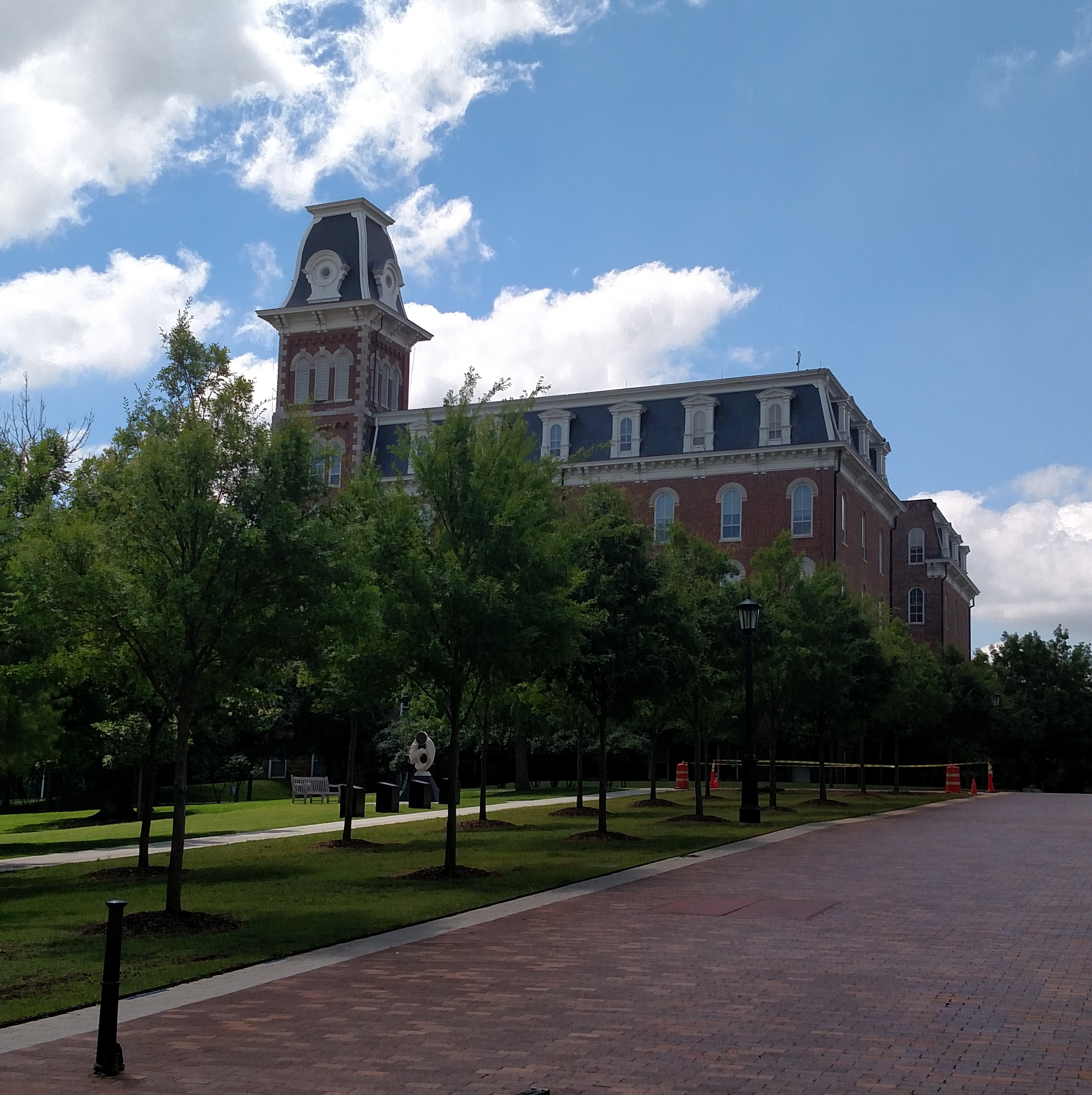
Old Main (1926–1928)

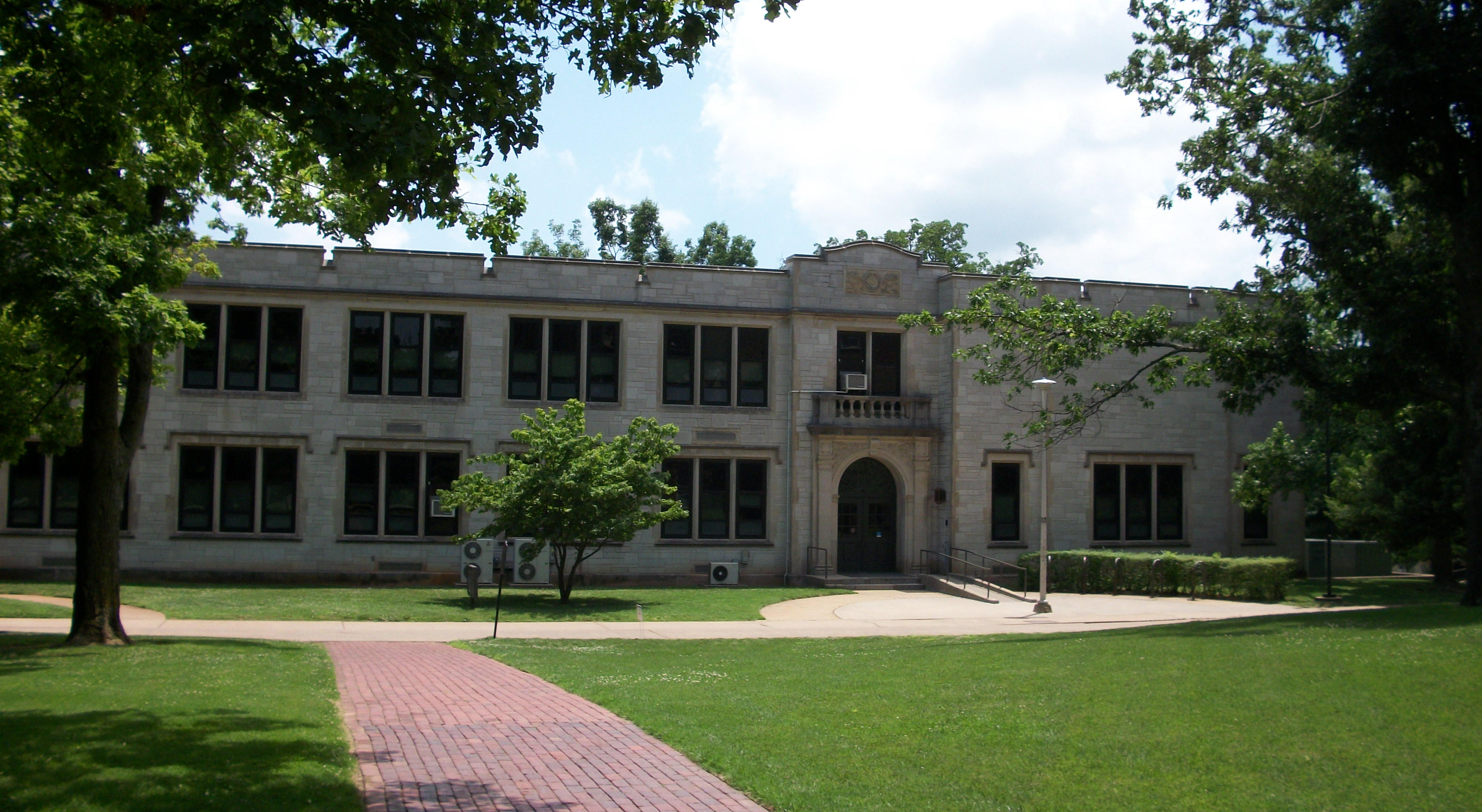
Ozark Hall (temporary)

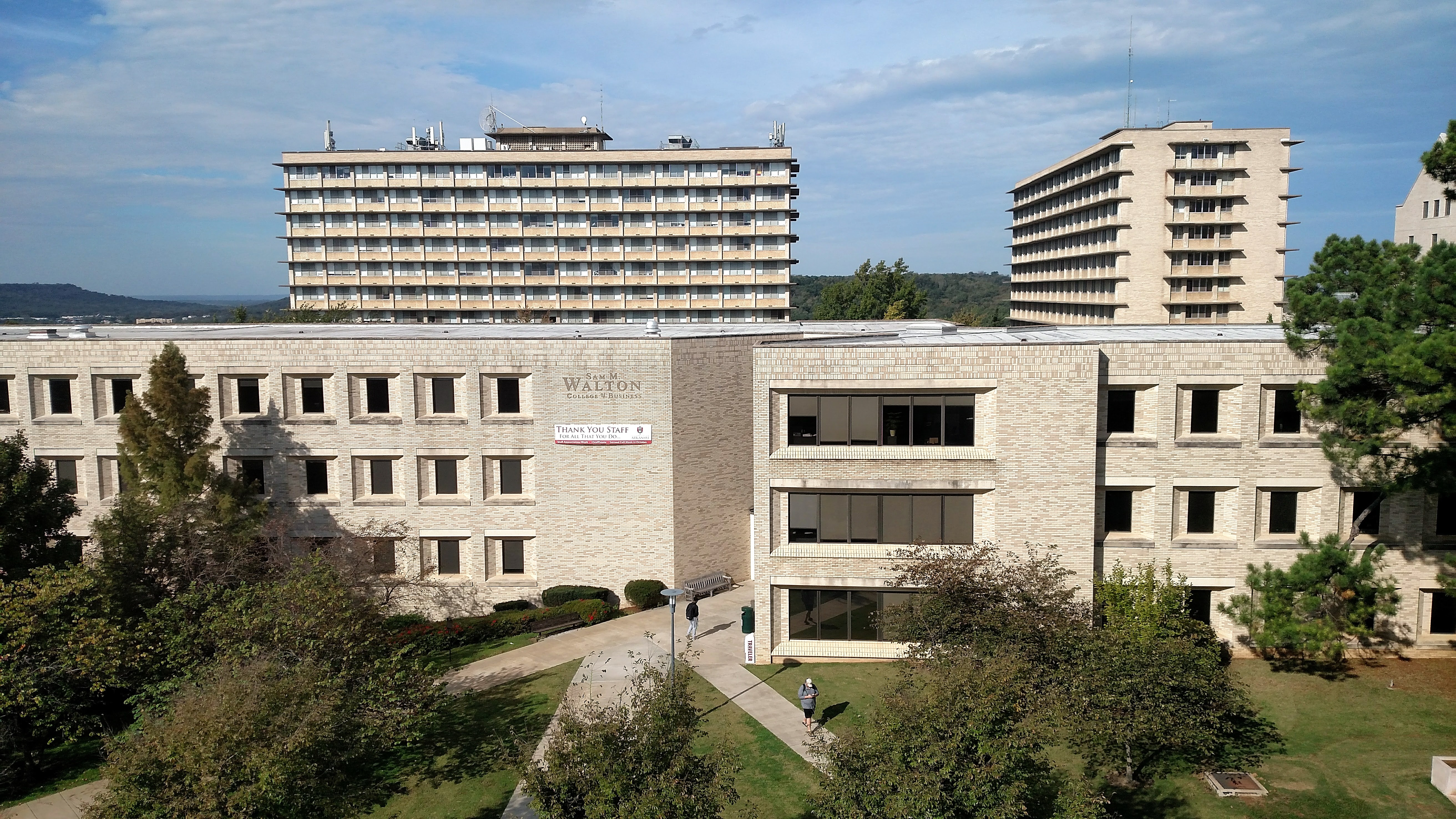
Business Building (1978–present)

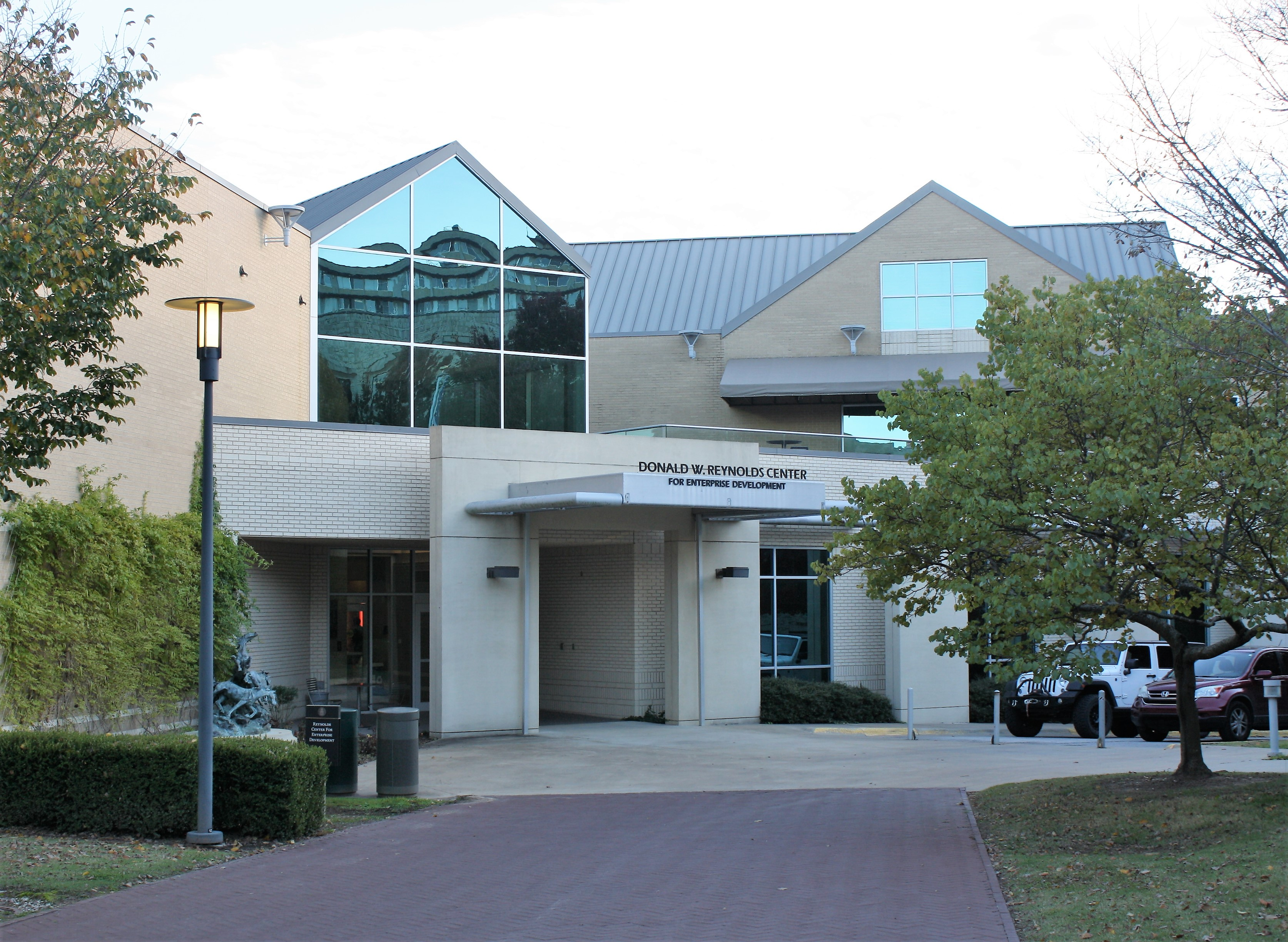
Donald W. Reynolds Center for Enterprise Development (1996–present)

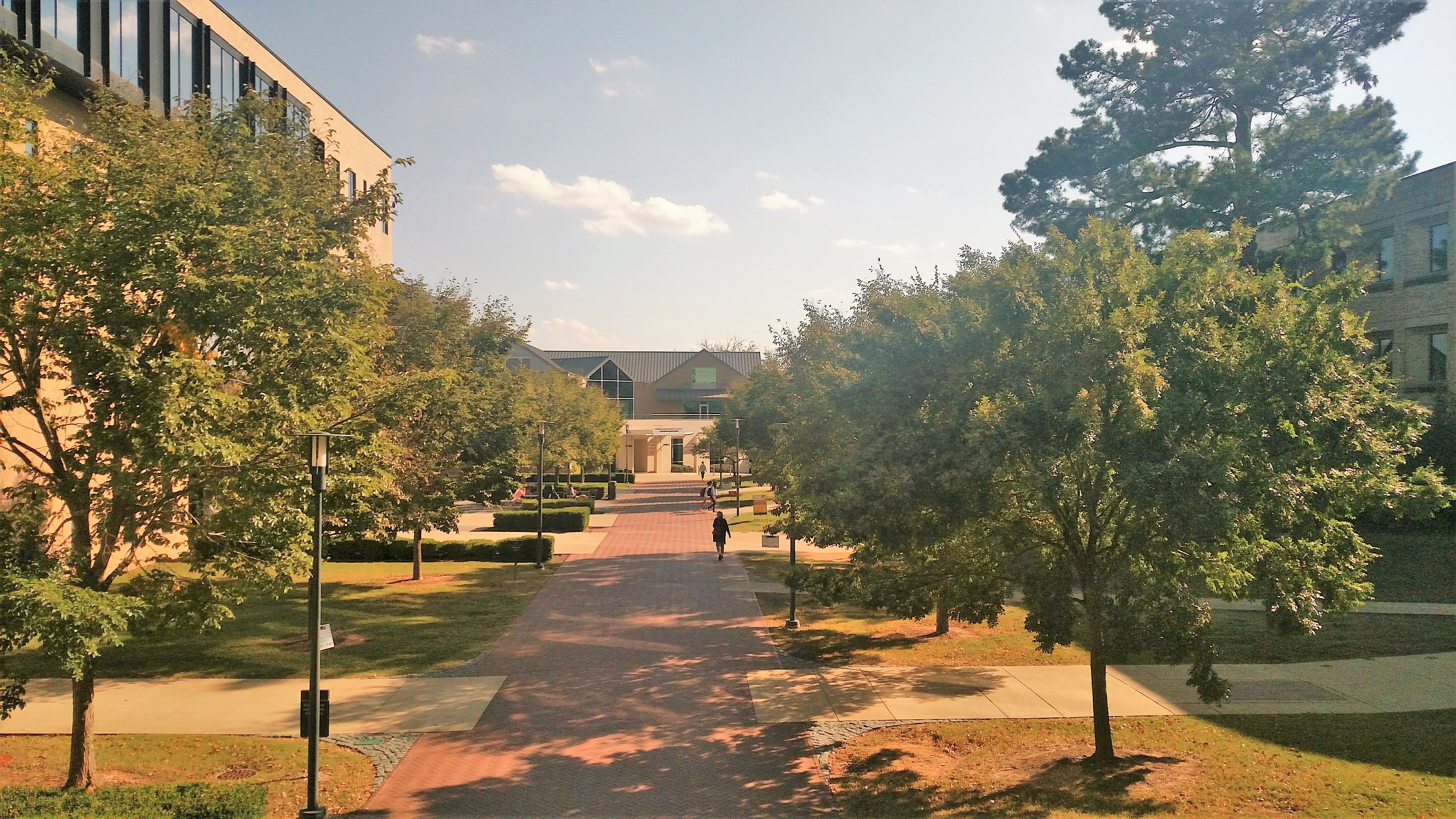
Linda Shollmier Plaza (2002–present)

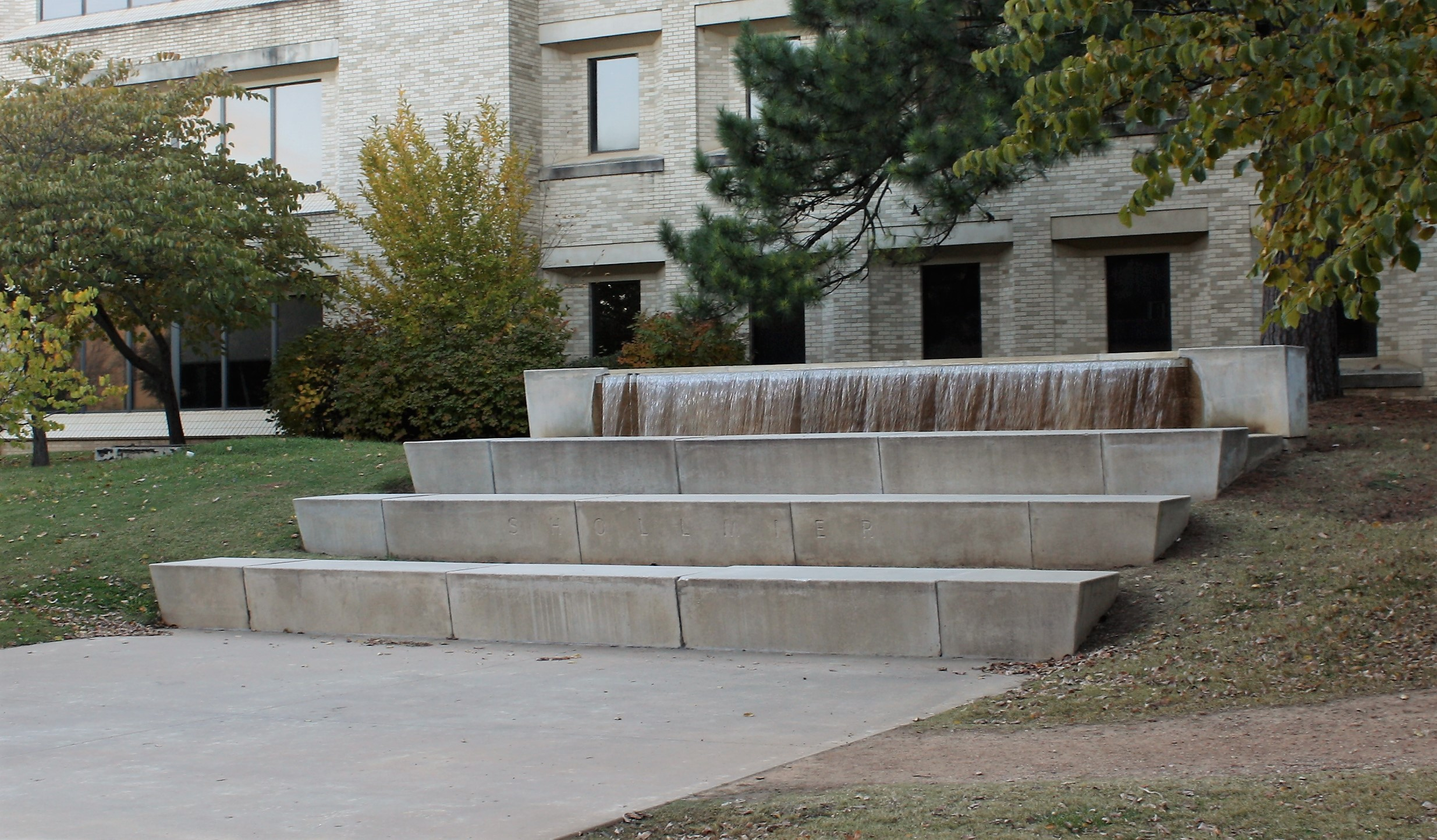
Shollmier Fountain (2002–present)

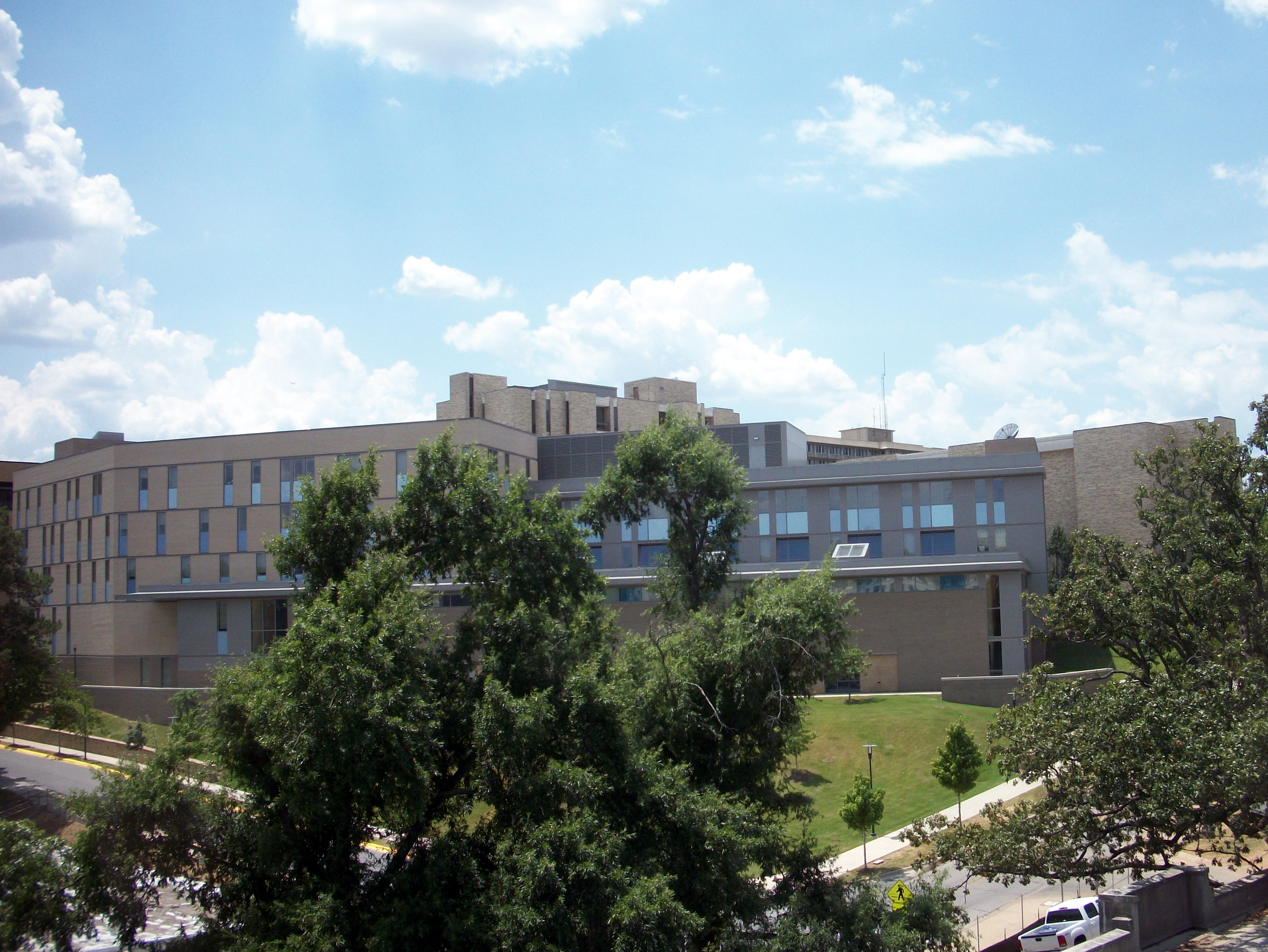
J.B. Hunt Transport Services Center for Academic Excellence (2007–present)

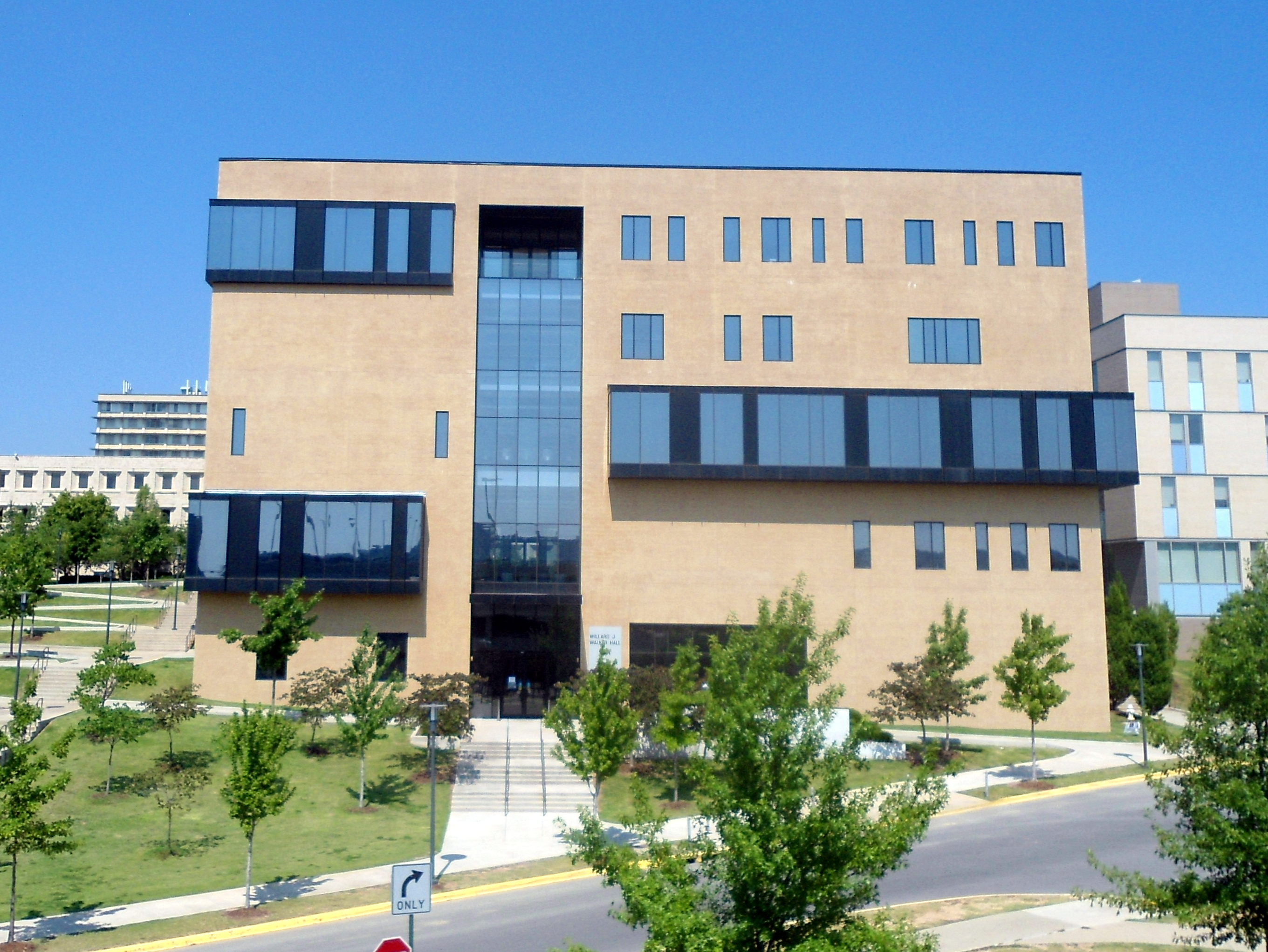
Willard J. Walker Hall (2007–present)

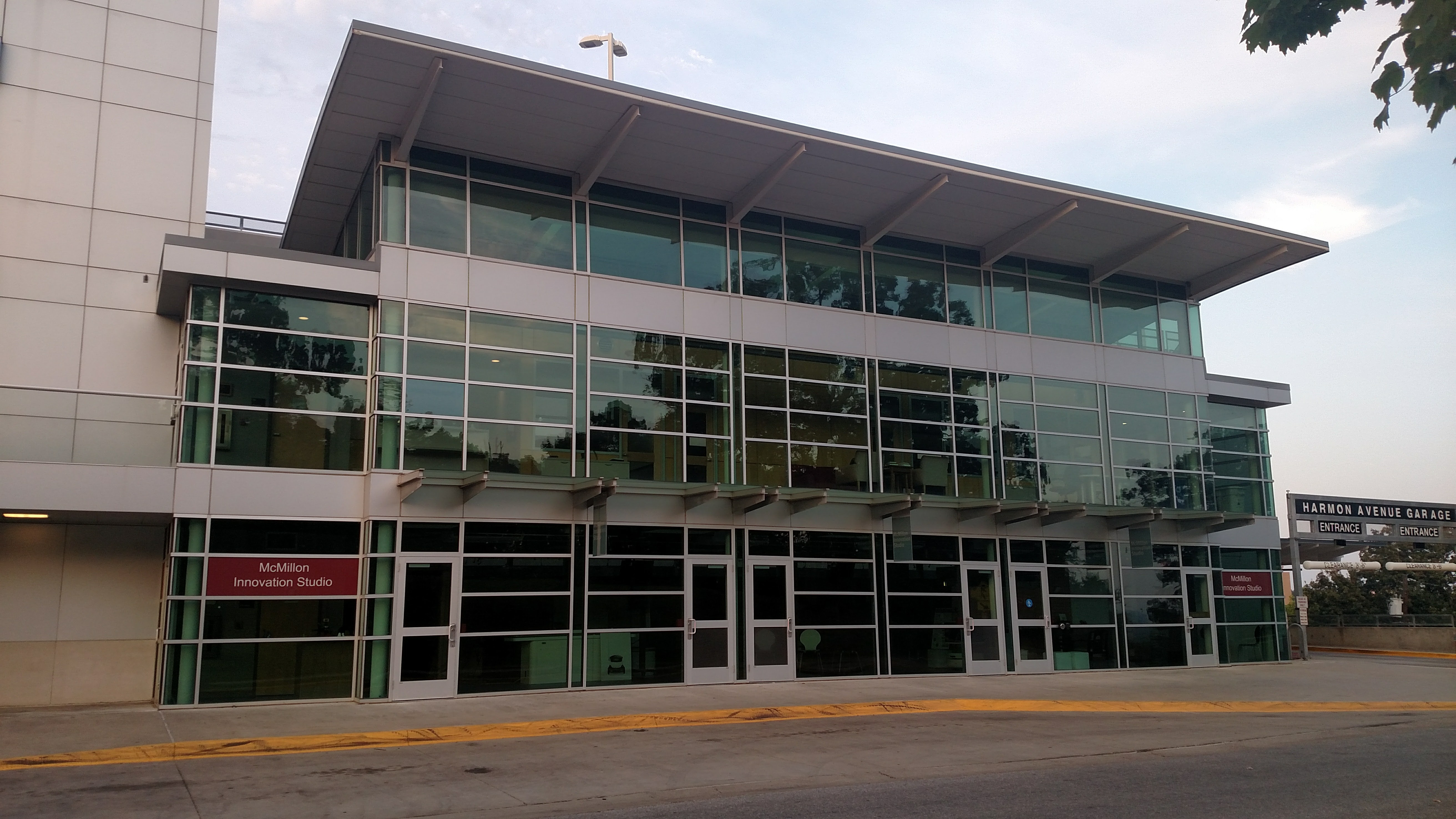
McMillon Innovation Studio (2016–present)

== Notable alumni ==
- Vern Clark, retired admiral who served as the Chief of Naval Operations of the United States Navy
- William T. Dillard, founder and former president, chairman and CEO of Dillard's
- William T. Dillard II, chairman and CEO of Dillard's
- Joe T. Ford, vice chairman of the Augusta National Golf Club and former CEO and co-founder of Alltel
- Scott T. Ford, CEO of Westrock Group, LLC and board of directors of AT&T
- John Furner, president and CEO of Walmart U.S.
- Sonja Hubbard, principal owner of the Yates Group and former CEO of E-Z Mart Stores Inc.
- Jerry Jones, owner, president, and general manager of the Dallas Cowboys
- Brandi Joplin, former senior vice president and CFO of Sam's Club
- Anthony J. Lewis, former CFO and vice president of AT&T
- Ricardo Martinelli, Panamanian politician and businessman who was the 36th president of Panama
- Mack McLarty, former CEO of CenterPoint Energy who served as President Bill Clinton's first White House Chief of Staff
- Doug McMillon, CEO of Walmart Inc.
- Gary Norcross, former chairman, president, and CEO of Fidelity National Information Services (FIS)
- John N. Roberts, III, president and CEO of J.B. Hunt
- Jackson T. Stephens, co-founder and former CEO of Stephens Inc.
- Barry Switzer, former football coach at The University of Oklahoma and former coach of the Dallas Cowboys
- J.K. Symancyk, CEO of PetSmart and former president and CEO of Academy Sports + Outdoors
- James Kirk Thompson, chairman of J.B. Hunt
- Donald John Tyson, former president and CEO of Tyson Foods
- John H. Tyson, chairman of Tyson Foods
- Jim Walton, chairman of Arvest Bank and former board of directors at Walmart Inc.
- S. Robson Walton, former senior vice president and chairman of Walmart Inc. and principal owner of the Denver Broncos
- Ed Wilson, CEO and founder of Dreamcatcher Media LLC, former president of CBS Enterprises, NBC Enterprises, and Fox Broadcasting Company

== Notable Faculty Members ==
According to Research.com and Elsevier, faculty at Walton College are ranked among the top 2% of scientists and most cited researchers in the world:

- Varun Grover, Distinguished Professor of Information Systems and George & Boyce Billingsley Endowed Chair at the Department of Information Systems. He is one of the top four IS researchers globally and is ranked the 15th top scientist in Business Management by Research.com. Reuters recognized him as one of 100 Highly Cited Scholars globally in all Business disciplines, while Stanford University ranked him 6th in the IS discipline.
- Mary Lacity, Distinguished Professor of Information Systems, Director of the Blockchain Center of Excellence, and Senior Editor for MIS Quarterly Executive. She is known for her research in automation, outsourcing and blockchain and is one of only three academics to ever be inducted into The International Association of Outsourcing Professionals Hall of Fame. According to Google Scholar, her work has been cited over 22,700 times.
- Matthew A. Waller, Former Dean, Sam M. Walton Leadership Chair in Business, and Professor of Supply Chain Management. He is a recipient of the Distinguished Service Award from the Council of Supply Chain Management, has co-authored the 5th most cited article in the history of Decision Sciences, and serves on the Board of Directors of the Winthrop Rockefeller Institute and Private Equity Advisory Board of Natural Capital.
- Remko Van Hoek, Clinical Professor of Supply Chain Management who has held supply chain and procurement executive roles at Nike, Inc., PwC and Disney. He is in the top 2% of scientists globally and is a fellow of Chartered Institute of Procurement & Supply and Chartered Institute of Logistics and Transport.
- Rajiv Sabherwal, Distinguished Professor and Edwin & Karlee Bradberry Endowed Chair, Department of Information Systems. Known for his research on the management, use, and impact of information technologies, he currently serves as co-Deputy Editor-in-Chief for the Journal of Strategic Information Systems, Senior Editor for the Journal of the Association for Information Systems, Department Editor for Decision Sciences, and is a member of the editorial board of Journal of Management Information Systems.
- Scot Burton, Distinguished Professor and Tyson Research Chair, Department of Marketing. He has published more than 100 refereed articles in top business journals, served the U.S. Bureau of Labor Statistics and the FDA, and is a recipient of the American Marketing Association’s Marketing and Society Special Interest Group Lifetime Achievement Award.
- Vern J. Richardson, Distinguished Professor, Department of Accounting. He was formerly editor at The Accounting Review and is currently an editor at Accounting Horizons.
- Christopher C. Rosen, Professor, Department of Management. His research on employee well-being, self-regulation, and organizational politics has appeared in leading scholarly journals and he currently serves as an Associate Editor for Journal of Management.
- Molly Rapert, Associate Professor of Marketing, Director for the Walton College of Business Center for Teaching Effectiveness, and recipient of the Marketing Management Association's Top-in-Nation Marketing Faculty Award.
