= Michael A. Hitt =

American business management scholar, consultant, academic and author

- Occupations: Business management scholar, consultant, academic and author

Academic background
- Education: BBA; MBA; PhD., Organization Theory/Organizational Behavior
- Alma mater: Texas Tech University; University of Colorado Boulder

Academic work
- Institutions: Texas A&M University; Texas Tech University

Michael A. Hitt is an American business management scholar, consultant, academic and author. He is a University Distinguished Professor Emeritus at Texas A&M University and a Distinguished Visiting Research Scholar at Texas Tech University.

Hitt is most known for his work on strategic entrepreneurship, strategic planning, and resource management. His publications comprise research articles and books including Strategic Management: Competitiveness and Globalization, Strategic Management: State of the Field and Its Future and Organizational Behavior. He was listed among the top scholars in economics, finance, and management by Times Higher Education, as a Highly Cited Researcher in the Web of Science, and has been ranked third globally by Research.com. Additionally, he is the recipient of several best article awards from journals, along with the 2001 Irwin Outstanding Educator Award from the Academy of Management, the 2021 Ambassador Award from the Journal of Operations Management, and the Lifetime Influence and Impact Award from the Family Enterprise Research Conference in 2023.

Hitt is a Fellow of the Academy of Management, the Strategic Management Society, and the Academy of International Business. He held various editorial roles such as the Editor of the Academy of Management Journal, Co-editor of the Strategic Entrepreneurship Journal, the Editor-in-Chief of Oxford Research Encyclopedia of Business and Management and Oxford Handbooks Online: Business and Management.

== Education and early career ==
Hitt earned a Bachelor of Business Administration in 1968 and an MBA in 1969 from Texas Tech University. From 1970 to 1971, he served as a Consultant at Samsonite Corporation and received a PhD in Organization Theory from the University of Colorado Boulder in 1974.

== Career ==
Hitt began his academic career as an assistant professor of management at Oklahoma State University–Stillwater in 1974. He became associate professor in 1977 and then a professor of Management until 1983, when he was appointed a professor in the Department of Management at the University of Texas at Arlington from 1983 to 1985. In 1985, he joined Texas A&M University as a Professor and in 1987 became the T.J. Barlow Professor of Business Administration, later becoming Distinguished Professor of Management in 1999 and Paul M. and Rosalie Robertson Chair in Business Administration (1991–2000). In 2000, he joined the faculty of Arizona State University as the Weatherup/Overby Chair in Executive Leadership. In 2003, he returned to Texas A&M University as a University Distinguished Professor (2003–2015), C.W. and Dorothy Conn Chair in New Ventures (2003–2007) and Joe B. Foster Chair in Business Leadership (2003–2015). He has been a University Distinguished Professor Emeritus since 2015. Concurrently, he took on the position of Distinguished Research Fellow at Texas Christian University from 2015 to 2019, and has been a Distinguished Visiting Research Scholar at Texas Tech University since 2024.

Hitt was involved with the Strategic Management Society from 1990 to 2010, holding positions such as president and Trustee.

== Research ==
Hitt has contributed to the field of business, economics and management by studying strategic entrepreneurship, mergers and acquisitions, international business strategy and resource orchestration.

=== Strategic entrepreneurship ===
Hitt has researched strategic entrepreneurship throughout his career. In the late 1990s, he and Duane Ireland began integrating research in entrepreneurship and strategic management, suggesting that firms need both strategic planning and entrepreneurial qualities for long-term success. He co-authored the book Strategic Management: Competitiveness and Globalization with Ireland and Robert Hoskisson, observing that younger firms may excel in entrepreneurship but lack strategic vision, while established firms may prioritize strategy but become risk-averse, leaving them vulnerable to innovative competitors. Following this, in 2001, he and Ireland co-edited a special issue in the Strategic Management Journal on strategic entrepreneurship, thereafter writing several conceptual pieces explaining its theoretical base. He was also a lead author on a paper published in Academy of Management Perspectives in 2011 which detailed their more developed thinking on strategic entrepreneurship.

=== Mergers and acquisitions ===
Hitt's work on mergers and acquisitions focused on the effects on innovation and characteristics. He started working on this subject in the late 1980s, with his first article published in 1991, where he examined the impact of acquisitive growth on managerial commitment to innovation, suggesting that factors like the acquisition process and post-acquisition conditions influence managers' dedication to innovation, shaping strategic decision-making. In a study funded by the NSF, he discovered why M&As often have longer term negative effects on firm innovation, including the concept of suspended animation of R&D projects in target firms during the time of negotiations. Later, his research further expanded to identifying the characteristics of high performing and low performing M&As. He co-wrote a book, Mergers and Acquisitions: A Guide to Creating Value for Stakeholders, alongside Jeffrey Harrison and Ireland, which utilized a resource orchestration framework to examine which combinations of acquiring and target firms' capabilities are likely to create the most value for stakeholders. Ithai Stern stated that the work is "a travel guide holding everything you need to know for a perfect journey through the world of mergers and acquisitions."

=== International strategy and institutions ===
Hitt explored the effects of institutions on international strategies, with his early research focusing on how international diversification impacts firm performance, noting initial benefits, diminishing returns, and implications for competitive advantage in product-diversified firms. He looked into country institutions which then extended to regional institutions because firms often focus their international market entries in regions and countries therein. This research has extended to the focus on the effects of polycentric institutions on entrepreneurial strategies and entrepreneurs' social networks across countries as well as how firm resources affect their international strategies. Most recently, he investigated how major environmental disruptions, like pandemics, have affected country institutions that in turn have affected firms' international strategies such as the global or regional supply chains.

=== Resource orchestration ===
Hitt studied the corporate strategies of resource orchestration for improved management as well. He conducted research on firm competencies, corporate strategies, and the resource-based view, noting early criticisms of its static nature. Alongside David Sirmon and Ireland, he developed a dynamic model for resource management to create customer value and competitive advantage. Thereafter, he collaborated and published several empirical studies testing parts of the model proposed in the former article. Additionally, in 2011, he extended the original model, referring to it as resource orchestration, contrasting it with Adner and Helfat's concept of asset orchestration.

== Recognition ==
- 1992 – Fellow, Academy of Management
- 2001 – Irwin Outstanding Educator Award, Academy of Management
- 2005 – Fellow, Strategic Management Society
- 2017 – Fellow, Academy of International Business
- 2017 – Distinguished Educator Award, Academy of Management
- 2021 – Ambassador Award, Journal of Operations Management
- 2023 – Lifetime Influence and Impact Award, Family Enterprise Research Conference

== Bibliography ==
=== Selected books ===
- Management: Concepts and Effective Practice (1983) ISBN 978-0314472151
- Strategic Management: Competitiveness and Globalization (1995) ISBN 978-0324114805
- Mergers and Acquisitions: A Guide to Creating Value for Stakeholders (2001) ISBN 978-0195112856
- Competing for Advantage (2004) ISBN 978-0538475167
- Organizational Behavior: A Strategic Approach (2006) ISBN 978-0470920909
- Strategic Management: State of the Field and its Future (2021) ISBN 978-0190090890

=== Selected articles ===
- Hitt, M. A., Hoskisson, R. E., & Kim, H. (1997). International diversification: Effects on innovation and firm performance in product-diversified firms. Academy of Management Journal, 40(4), pages 767–798.
- Zahra, S. A., Ireland, R. D., & Hitt, M. A. (2000). International expansion by new venture firms: International diversity, mode of market entry, technological learning, and performance. Academy of Management Journal, 43(5), pages 925–950.
- Hitt, M. A., Ireland, R. D., Camp, S. M., & Sexton, D. L. (2001). Strategic entrepreneurship: Entrepreneurial strategies for wealth creation. Strategic Management Journal, 22(6‐7), pages 479–491.
- Hitt, M. A., Bierman, L., Shimizu, K., & Kochhar, R. (2001). Direct and moderating effects of human capital on strategy and performance in professional service firms: A resource-based perspective. Academy of Management Journal, 44(1), pages 13–28.
- Sirmon, D. G., Hitt, M. A., & Ireland, R. D. (2007). Managing firm resources in dynamic environments to create value: Looking inside the black box. Academy of Management Review, 32(1), pages 273–292.
- Arregle, J. L., Calabrò, A., Hitt, M. A., Kano, L., & Schwens, C. (2024). Family business and international business: Breaking silos and establishing a rigorous way forward. Journal of World Business, 59(3), 101532.
