= Daugherty (surname) =

Origin
- Origin: Irish

Other names
- Related names: Dougherty Docherty Doherty

Daugherty is a surname of Irish or Gaelic origin. It is a variant of Ó Dochartaigh or Doherty. People with the surname include:

- Amira Daugherty, American rapper and singer
- Billy Joe Daugherty (1952–2009), American founder and pastor of Victory Christian Center
- Brad Daugherty, American basketball player
- Brad Daugherty (poker player), professional poker player
- Brant Daugherty (born 1985) American actor
- Bret D. Daugherty, major general former of Washington state
- Bud Daugherty (1890–1937) American footballer coach and administrator
- Charles L. Daugherty (1873–1922) American politician served as the Oklahoma Commissioner of Labor
- Chris Daugherty, American construction worker and reality television personality
- CJ Daugherty also known as Christi Daugherty, British writer
- Derri Daugherty, American record producer, songwriter, guitarist and singer
- Dick Daugherty (1929–2009) American footballer player
- Doc Daugherty (1927–2015) American baseball player
- Doc Daugherty (musician), Ralph Edward Daugherty, American jazz musician
- Duffy Daugherty, American football coach
- Enos Daugherty Hoge (1831–1912) American judge of the Supreme court of the Utah territory
- Evan Daugherty (born 1981) American screenwriter
- Frederick Alvin Daugherty (1914–2006) American judge
- Gary Daugherty, American politician member of Illinois House of Representatives
- George Daugherty, American-born conductor and music director
- Gordon Daugherty, American computer scientist
- Harry M. Daugherty (1860–1941), American politician
- Herschel Daugherty, American actor and television director
- Jack Daugherty (disambiguation)
- James Daugherty, American author and illustrator
- James Alexander Daugherty (1847–1920), politician
- Jay Dee Daugherty, American drummer
- Jean Daugherty (1922–2000) American television personality
- Jeffrey Daugherty (1955–1988) American convicted serial killer
- Jennifer Daugherty (1979–2010), Greensburg, Pennsylvania murder victim
- Jerome Aloysius Daugherty Sebastian (1895–1960) American clergyman
- Jerome Daugherty (1849–1914), American Jesuit and president of Georgetown University
- John Daugherty White (1849–1920) American politician from Kentucky
- Jonathan Daugherty (died 1856) American storekeeper from Rosendale, Wisconsin
- Julius C. Daugherty Sr. (1924–1987) American politician served as a Democratic member of the Georgia House of Representatives
- June Daugherty (1956–2021) Women's baseball coach
- Junior Daugherty (1930–2023) American fiddler, guitar player and songwriter
- Kelsey Daugherty (born 1996) American soccer player
- Lindsey Daugherty, American attorney and politician
- Marshall Daugherty (1915–1991) American sculptor
- Michael Daugherty, composer
- Pat Daugherty (disambiguation)
- Richard Daugherty (1922–2014) American archaeologist
- Ron Daugherty (born 1959) American footballer player from Minnesota
- Tom Daugherty (born 1975) American professional ten-pin bowler
- Tracy Daugherty, American author
- Marie Daugherty Webster (1859–1956) American artist, lecturer, businesswoman, and writer
- Mary Daugherty Abrams (1958–2025) American politician

== See also ==
- Daugherty
- Dougherty
