= Dougherty (surname) =

Dougherty is a surname of Irish origin. It may refer to many people.

It is a phonetic transcription of O'Dochartaigh, meaning "descendant of Dochartach," and is a variation of Doherty.

== A ==
- Andrew B. Dougherty (1863–1928), American politician from Michigan
- Archibald K. Dougherty (1835–1923), American politician from Michigan

== C ==
- Charles Dougherty
  - Charles Dougherty (baseball) (1879–1939), American baseball player in the pre-Negro leagues
  - Charles Dougherty (Florida politician) (1850-1915), Democrat U.S. Representative from Florida
  - Charles Dougherty (Georgia politician) (1801-1853), American politician from Georgia and Whig candidate from Georgia
  - Charles F. Dougherty (born 1937), U.S. Representative from Pennsylvania
  - Charles J. Dougherty (born 1949), President of Duquesne University in Pittsburgh, Pennsylvania
  - Charlie Dougherty (1862–1925), baseball player
- Christopher Dougherty (born 1988), Irish cricketer
- Curt Dougherty (born 1956), American politician

== D ==
- Dennis A. Dougherty (born 1952), American professor of chemistry at California Institute of Technology
- Dennis Joseph Dougherty (1865–1951), American cardinal of the Roman Catholic Church

== E ==
- Edward Emmett Dougherty (1876–1943) American Architect
- Ellsworth Dougherty (1921–1965), American biologist

== G ==
- George Samuel Dougherty (1865-1931), American detective and law enforcement officer
- Gill Dougherty (born 1961), French singer-songwriter

== I ==
- Ivan Dougherty (1907-1998), Australian Army officer during World War I who eventually attained the rank of Major General

== J ==
- John Dougherty (born 1964), Northern Irish writer and poet
- John Joseph Dougherty (1907-1986), American Catholic bishop
- Joseph Patrick Dougherty (1905-1970), American Catholic bishop

== K ==
- Kevin Dougherty (born 1962), associate justice of the Supreme Court of Pennsylvania

== M ==
- Mark Dougherty (1967–), American Soccer Player from California.
- Marion Dougherty (1923-2011), American casting director
- Michael Dougherty, American screenwriter

== P ==
- Patrick Dougherty
  - Patrick Dougherty (bishop) (1931-2010), Australian Roman Catholic Bishop
  - Patrick Dougherty (Medal of Honor) (1844-?), American Civil War sailor and Medal of Honor recipient
  - Pat Dougherty (born 1948), American politician and Missouri state legislator
  - Patsy Dougherty (1876-1940), American baseball player
- Paul Dougherty (1877-1947), American Impressionist painter

== R ==
- Richard Dougherty (1932–2016), American Olympic ice hockey player
- Richard E. Dougherty (1880–1961), American civil engineer

== S ==
- Sean Dougherty (astrophysicist), British/Canadian astrophysicist

== T ==
- J. Thomas Dougherty, American diplomat

== W ==
- Walter Hampden Dougherty (1879-1955), American actor and theatre manager
- William Dougherty (1932-2010), American politician who served as Lieutenant Governor of South Dakota

== See also ==
- Daugherty (disambiguation) § People with the surname
- Docherty (surname)
- Doherty (surname)
