= James Docherty =

James Docherty may refer to:

- James Docherty (1950s footballer), Scottish footballer for Queen's Park and Airdrieonians
- James Docherty (1890s footballer), Scottish footballer for Derby County and Luton Town
- Jim Docherty (born 1956), Scottish footballer
- Jamie Docherty (fl. 1900s–1910s), Scottish footballer
- Jimmy Docherty (1931–2014), Scottish rugby union player

== See also ==
- James Docharty (1829–1878), Scottish landscape painter
