= Docherty (surname) =

Docherty is an Irish and Scottish surname. Notable people with the surname include:

- Bevan Docherty (born 1977), triathlete from New Zealand
- Craig Docherty (born 1979), professional boxer from Scotland
- David Docherty, British writer, journalist and television executive
- Fiona Docherty (born 1975), multi-sport athlete and runner from New Zealand
- George MacPherson Docherty (1911–2008), American Presbyterian minister
- Glenn Docherty, Australian politician
- Jack Docherty (born 1962), Scottish writer, actor and producer
- Jacqueline Docherty, British nursing administrator
- James Docherty (1890s footballer), Scottish footballer for Derby County and Luton Town
- James Docherty (1950s footballer), Scottish footballer for Queen's Park and Airdrieonians
- Jamie Docherty, Scottish football player in the early 20th century
- Jim Docherty (born 1956), Scottish football player in the late 20th century
- John Docherty (boxer) (born 1997), British boxer
- John Docherty (footballer, born 1935), Scottish football wing half
- John Docherty (footballer, born 1940), Scottish football player and manager
- Laurence Docherty (born 1980), Dutch field hockey player of Scottish origin
- Leo Docherty (born 1976), British politician
- Mark Docherty (footballer) (born 1988), Scottish football player
- Martin Docherty (born 1971), Scottish National Party (SNP) politician, Member of Parliament (MP) for West Dunbartonshire since May 2015
- Mick Docherty (born 1950), English football player and coach
- Nicola Docherty (born 1992), Scottish footballer
- Peter Docherty, English footballer
- Richard Docherty (1899–1979), Catholic priest and missionary in Australia
- Robert Docherty (born 1965), Scottish football player
- Stephen Docherty (born 1976), Scottish football player
- Steve Docherty (born 1950), Australian professional tennis player
- Thomas Docherty (politician), British politician
- Tom Docherty (1924–2020), English football player
- Tommy Docherty (1928–2020), Scottish football player and manager
- Tony Docherty (born 1971), Scottish football player
- Valerie Docherty, Canadian politician

== See also ==
- Docherty (novel)
- Glen Docherty, a valley in Wester Ross, Scotland
- Doherty (surname)
- Dockery
