= Docherty =

Docherty may refer to:

- Docherty (surname)
- Docherty (novel), by William McIlvanney (1975)
- Glen Docherty, a glen in Wester Ross, Scotland
