= Dougherty =

Dougherty may refer to:

== Schools ==
- Dougherty Elementary School
- Dougherty Valley High School

== Places ==
In the United States

- Dougherty, California
- Dougherty, Georgia
- Dougherty, Iowa
- Dougherty, Oklahoma
- Dougherty County, Georgia

Elsewhere

- Dougherty (island), a phantom island near Antarctica

== Other uses ==
- Dougherty (surname), origin of the name and a list of people with the name
- Dougherty (apple), an Australian apple cultivar

== See also ==
- Daugherty (disambiguation)
- Doherty (disambiguation)
