= Abbie Rowe =

American photographer

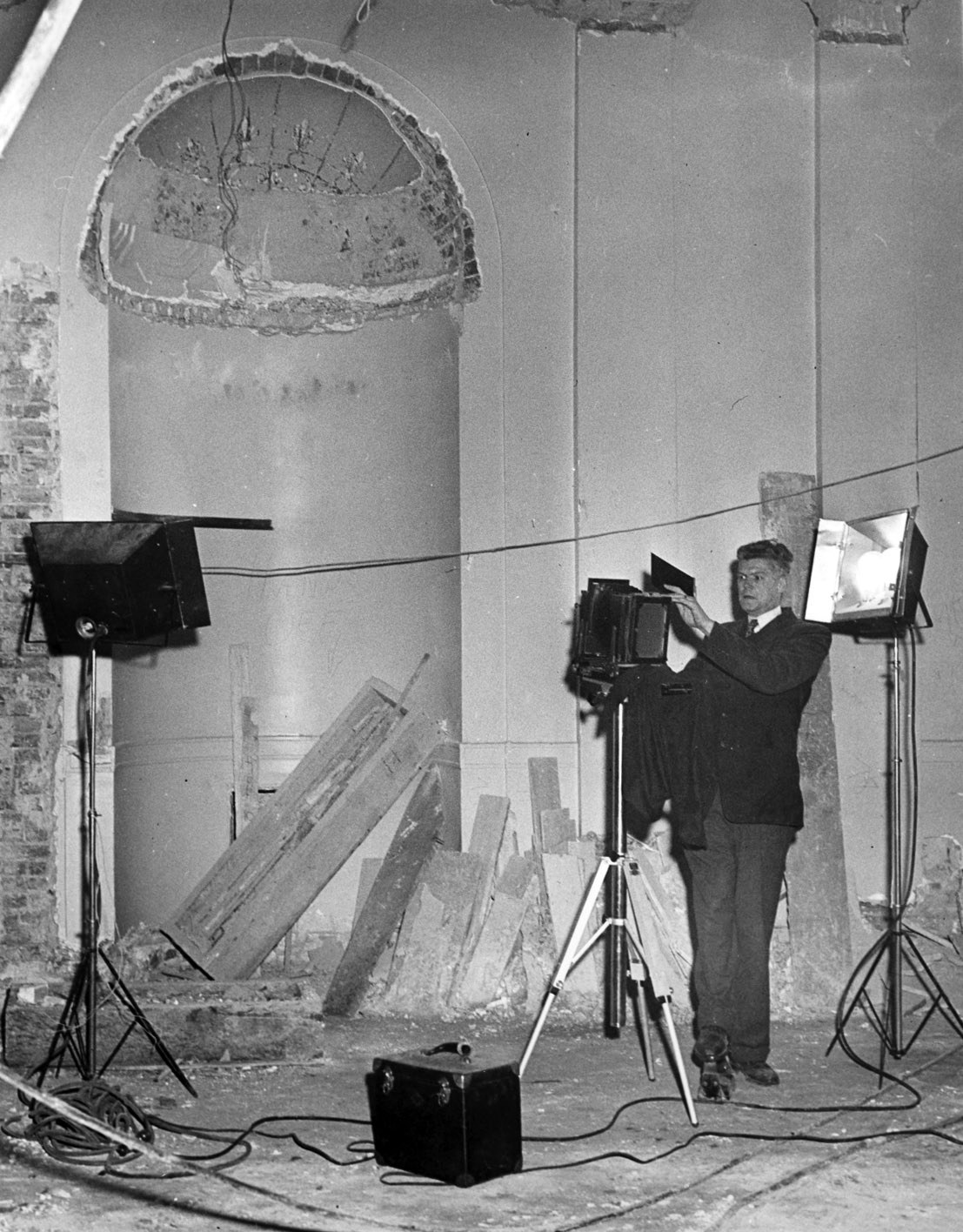
- Rowe in 1950, during the White House Reconstruction
- Born: Abbie Alpheus Row; 23 August 1905; Strasburg, Virginia, U.S.
- Died: 17 April 1967 (aged 61); Alexandria, Virginia, U.S.
- Occupation: Photographer

Abbie Alpheus Rowe (August 23, 1905 – April 17, 1967) was an American photographer, best known for being an official White House photographer from 1941 to 1967, covering five successive administrations.

== Biography ==
In 1930, Rowe was employed by the Federal Government with the Bureau of Public Roads, and in 1932, he joined the Office of Public Buildings and Public Parks (now known as the National Capital Parks and part of the National Park Service). It was in the latter job, that he took an interest in photography, when working as a policeman for the Roaches Run Waterfowl Sanctuary. His photographs of the birds led him to an apprenticeship to the NCP photographer, and he would be promoted as assistant photographer, and then senior photographer.

In December 1941, President Franklin D. Roosevelt wanted a photographer to temporarily cover his official day-to-day duties (which could be seen as a precursor to the Chief Official White House Photographer). Coincidentally, one of Rowe's earliest photographs was of the First Lady riding horseback along the Mount Vernon Memorial Highway in the 1930s. Roosevelt was so impressed by Rowe's work, that he kept the Virginian on to document other official White House events. Rowe went on to photograph the presidencies of Harry S. Truman, Dwight D. Eisenhower, John F. Kennedy and Lyndon B. Johnson.

In 1963, Rowe received the Distinguished Service Award of the Department of the Interior, and in 1966, Johnson gave him a commemorative medal for his 61st birthday. In April 1967, Rowe died of cancer, having been diagnosed two years earlier.
