= Gill Dougherty =

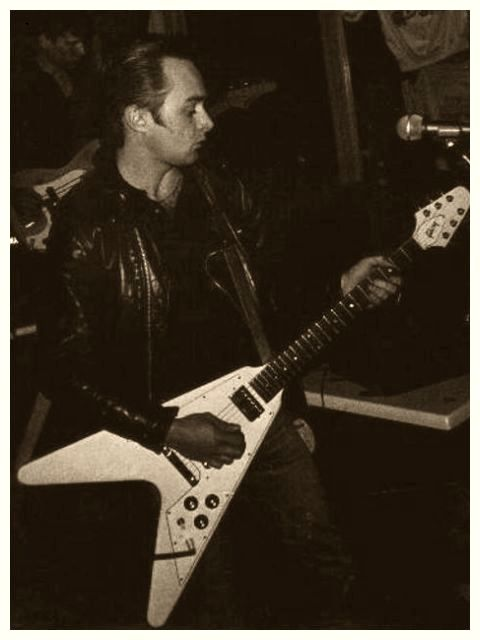
- Gill Dougherty, in 1986

Background information
- Born: 1961 (age 64–65)
- Origin: France
- Genres: Power pop Rock
- Years active: 1978–1993
- Label: Réflexes Pathe Marconi]
- Website: MySpace

Gill Dougherty (born April 1961) is a French singer and songwriter, heavily influenced by 1970s and 1980s rock, who was born in Toulouse.

At the end of the 1970s, punk rock was sweeping through France and he found inspiration with The Jam, The Clash, the Sex Pistols, The B-52's, and The Ramones. In France, he found his influences in Bijou, Téléphone and Starshooter. Later, he also noted Link Wray and Chris Spedding as great influences.

== Biography ==
=== At the beginning ===
In 1979 he formed, on an off-chance, his first band "Lipstick" with Olivier Boumendil on bass and Jean Marc Bibron on drums.

Lipstick got its first hit on a local level with the song "Accident". There are some traces of this sound from his early period during which bands such as Classe X, Les Fils de Joie (Sons of Joy) and The Lords also appeared. Other early songs of Lipstick are "Jenny", "Ballade Pour Une Bourgeoise", "Despy and Joan", and "Je Ne Veux Plus Te Voir" (I Don't Want to See You Anymore).

=== 1980: Deltour Productions ===
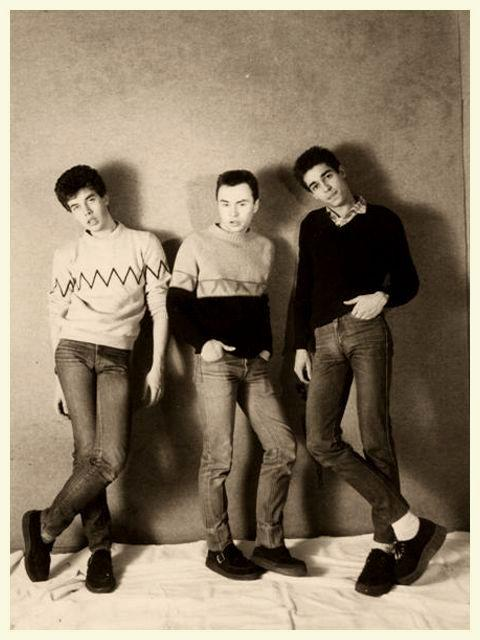
Incorruptibles

In 1980, Gill Dougherty formed Incorruptibles with two ex-members of The Lords. In March 1981, Les Incorruptibles drew critical attention to themselves at a concert in the Théâtre du Taur with songs like "Les Soleils de La Nuit (Suns of The Night)", "Bande Dessinée (Cartoons)", and "Dr Jackson". The story of Incorruptibles, with whom he recorded three albums with Studio Deltour (Predestine, Annabelle and Moi je Doute), ended as quickly as it had begun, and, from 1982 on, Dougherty performed under his own name and recorded three albums: Envie de Tuer (Need to Kill), Monsieur Dupond and Interdit de Séjour, also under contract with Studio Deltour. At the same time, he appears on stage with Gringos, Évadés d'Alcatraz, Misérables, Classe X, and formed a band with Alain Gerard, previously the drummer of Fils de Joie, and Jean Marc Leclerc of Évadé d'Alcatraz on bass.

=== 1984: Reflexes venture ===
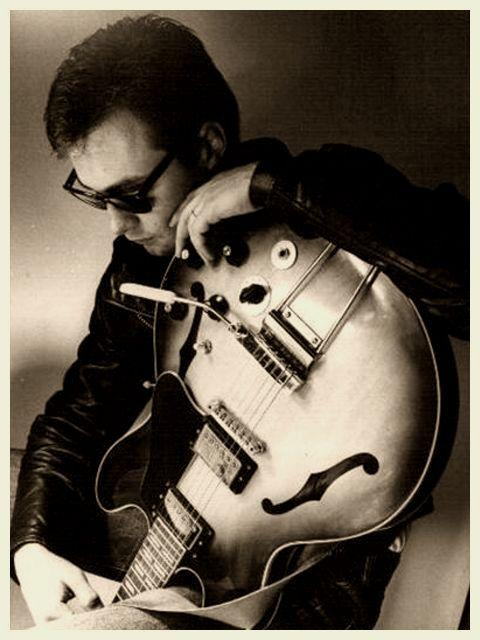
Dougherty, on Reflexes Label

In 1984, while flipping through a magazine in the hospital, following a motorcycle accident, he came across an article about the song "Tu Verras, Tu Verras" (You Will See, You Will See), by the French band Ablettes, produced by Patrice Fabien for the record label Réflexes. Fabien, who had been a producer with CBS, expressed an interest in the demo of "Moi Je Doute" (I Doubt) from 1981. Dougherty contacted him and signed with Réflexes for two singles, "Moi Je Doute" and "Fric Frac Noise", also recorded at Studio Deltour. The single rapidly climbed the playlists of the Europe 1, RTL, and France Inter national radio stations. At the time, Dougherty maintained only tenuous connections with the music business and did not show any will to succeed and lost his chance to produce any follow-up to this hit. Nevertheless, he played at the Rose Bonbon with the Bandits, Ich Libido, Follie's, Ricky Amigos, les Les Désaxés (Offsets), and Drucilla, who were all signed to Réflexes. Their drummer is Jean Luc Guitard, and the bass player is Jean Marc Leclerc. The track is recorded a pre-recorded tape of Eddy Mitchell at the Palais des sports where the applause was preserved. The track was mixed in one night at Studio Caroline with Patrick Giordano, the guitarist from the Bandits, but the live recording was never released. In December 1984, he appeared at the "Zeleste de Barcelone" concert and made the cover of the Avanguardia.

=== The end of the 1980s: the other ones ===
In 1985 and 1986, Dougherty had an intensively creative period of writing during which he formed the Vicomtes (Jean Marc Leclerc on bass, Patrick Mir and Yves Bordes of the Partners, on the guitar and on drums, respectively. In that same period, he recorded numerous duos "La Femme Araignée" (Spider Woman) with Monique Sabatier of the Queen Bees, "Ne Joue Pas" (Do Not Play) with Caroline, the bass player of the Calamités and worked with many other artists including Marie Alcaraz (replaced by Anicée Alvina from Ici Paris (Here is Paris). He also recorded three new overproduced albums at Studio Deltour (La Vie Sans Toi (Life Without You), Où Etais Tu (Where Were You?), Mais Ne Reviens Jamais (But Never Come Back)). He also played with the Beach-Brothers, a "one summer" band, and occasionally sat in with the Strikers and the Shifters.

=== Bound for Glory ===
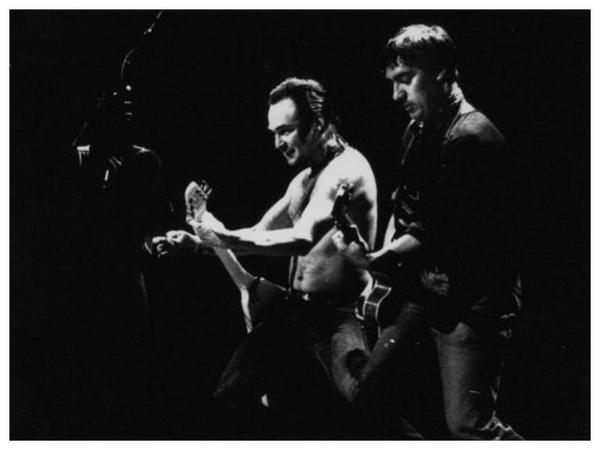
Hobos in Bourges (1990)

In 1989, he formed the Hobos with Dominique Dussoud on drums (Ex Little Helpers), Richard Arriaga on bass, Patrick Mir on guitar (Partners), Yann Legoff on saxophone and Philippe Danecker on harmonica. They recorded thirteen tracks in one day. On 12 April 1990 at the beginning of a tour with early Zebda, they played at the "Printemps de Bourges" (Spring in Bourges).

The Hobos disbanded in 1991. In 1993, Dougherty appeared briefly with the Freaks with Richard Arriaga on bass and Erick Pero on drums. On 10 March 1994 at the Bikini, he met Link Wray who signed a guitar for him, and authorised, despite the protests of his wife, Olive, to record the concert.

=== New horizons ===
Since the early 1990s, Gill Dougherty has seemingly dropped out of the music business. He is a dedicated sailboat enthusiast and lives in the north of Brittany, in the far west of France. Despite his musical silence, he has never turned his back as a collector of guitars. He is well known with his black Fender Stratocaster, but he has also been noted to play Rickenbacker 330, Flying V, Gibson ES-345, Gibson SG, Explorer, Telecaster, Gretsch 6120, and Danelectros.

== Music ==
=== Discography ===
Gill Dougherty wrote more than 200 songs

- Deltour Productions, Producer Georges Baux :
  - 1981 – Moi Je Doute, Prédestiné, Annabelle (Incorruptibles)
  - 1982 – Envie de Tuer, Monsieur Dupond, Interdit de Séjour (with Erick Pero, Serge Casero & Serge Faubert)
  - 1984 – Bikini 84 (Dougherty – 8 songs)
    - Toujours Plus Loin, Sans Un Mot, Fat bob Baby, Petit Chat, Sitting Bull...
  - 1986 – La Vie Sans Toi, Mais Ne Reviens Jamais, Où Étais-Tu ? (Dougherty)
  - 1989 – Bound for Glory (Hobos – LP 13 songs)
    - Dooggie Bop, La Femme Araignée, The Strike, Quand Tombe la nuit, C'est Tout Ce Qu'Elle Aime, Mais Ne Reviens Jamais, Marina, À Present Je T'Oublie...
  - 1990 – Bourges 90 (Hobos – LP 8 songs)
- Reflexes – Pathe Marconi, Producer Patrice Fabien:
  - 1984 – Moi Je Doute, Fric Frac Noise (Dougherty)
  - 1984 – Capot Rouge (unissued)
  - 1985 – Réflexes (Compilation)
  - 1985 – Live au Rose Bonbon (Dougherty – LP 10 songs)
    - Envie De Tuer, Sitting Bull, Moi Je Doute, Annabelle, Fric Frac Noise...

=== Contributions ===
- 1980 – La Voix with Michel Armengo (Art Mengo)
- 1983 – Les Yeux de la Momie, Hong Kong Folies with the French band Miserables
- 1985 – Doogie Bop for the radio
- 1986 – Ne Joue Pas With Caroline Augier of the French girls band The Calamities

=== On tour ===
- 1984 – Promotion Réflexes, Barcelone Zeleste
- 1985 – Promotion Réflexes, Printemps de Bourges 1985
- 1986 – Beach Brothers Tour 86
- 1990 – Bound for Glory Tour, Printemps de Bourges 1990)

=== Covers ===
Most of Gill Dougherty's songs are original, but sometimes, he also played some covers:

- Ghost Riders in the Sky (Traditional)
- Everybody's Stupid (Sparks)
- Hey Tonight, Who'll Stop The Rain (Creedence Clearwater Revival)
- Rumble (Link Wray)

== Sources ==
- Dougherty's Folders
- Newspapers :
  - French newspapers from 1982 to 1993;
  - Spanish newspapers La Vanguardia 1984;
  - Musical Press: Rock & Folk 1984, Guitars & Keyboards 1985, Nineteen 1984, 1985, Spanish newspapers Rock'In 1984...
  - Printemps de Bourges 1985 and 1990 with Hobos
  - French Rock Discography 1977–1997 (ISSN 1280-9675)
- On Radio and TV:
  - Radio: Playlist Europe 1, France Inter, Radio France International, Radios libres
  - TV shows: Graines de Rockers, Echo des Bahuts (with Jean-Louis Pujade), FR3, Quand Tombe La Nuit (Video Clip 1990)
- On Internet:
  - French New Wave
  - Calamities (French girls band, official site)
  - Encyclopedisque
  - Gill Dougherty on MySpace
