= Charles Doughty =

Charles Doughty may refer to:

- Charles Montagu Doughty (1843–1926), English poet and traveller
- Charles Doughty (lawyer) (1878–1956), British barrister
- Charles Doughty (politician) (1902–1973), British Member of Parliament and barrister; son of the above
- Charles Doughty-Wylie (1868–1915), English recipient of the Victoria Cross

== See also ==
- Charles Dougherty (disambiguation)
