= Charles Dougherty =

Charles Dougherty may refer to:

- Charles Dougherty (Georgia politician) (1801–1853), American politician from Georgia, Whig candidate for Governor of Georgia
- Charles F. Dougherty (born 1937), U.S. Representative from Pennsylvania
- Charles J. Dougherty (born 1949), President of Duquesne University in Pittsburgh, Pennsylvania
- Charles Dougherty (Florida politician) (1850–1915), Democrat U.S. Representative from Florida
- Charlie Dougherty (1862–1925), baseball player
- Charles Dougherty (baseball) (1879–1939), American baseball player in the pre-Negro leagues
- Charles B. Dougherty (1860–1924), officer in the Pennsylvania Army National Guard

== See also ==
- Charles Doherty (1855–1931), Canadian politician and jurist
- Charles Wiley Doherty, American politician in Mississippi
- Charles L. Daugherty (1873–1922), American politician in Oklahoma
- Charles Doughty (disambiguation)
