= White House Reconstruction =

Refurbishment of the White House from 1949 to 1952

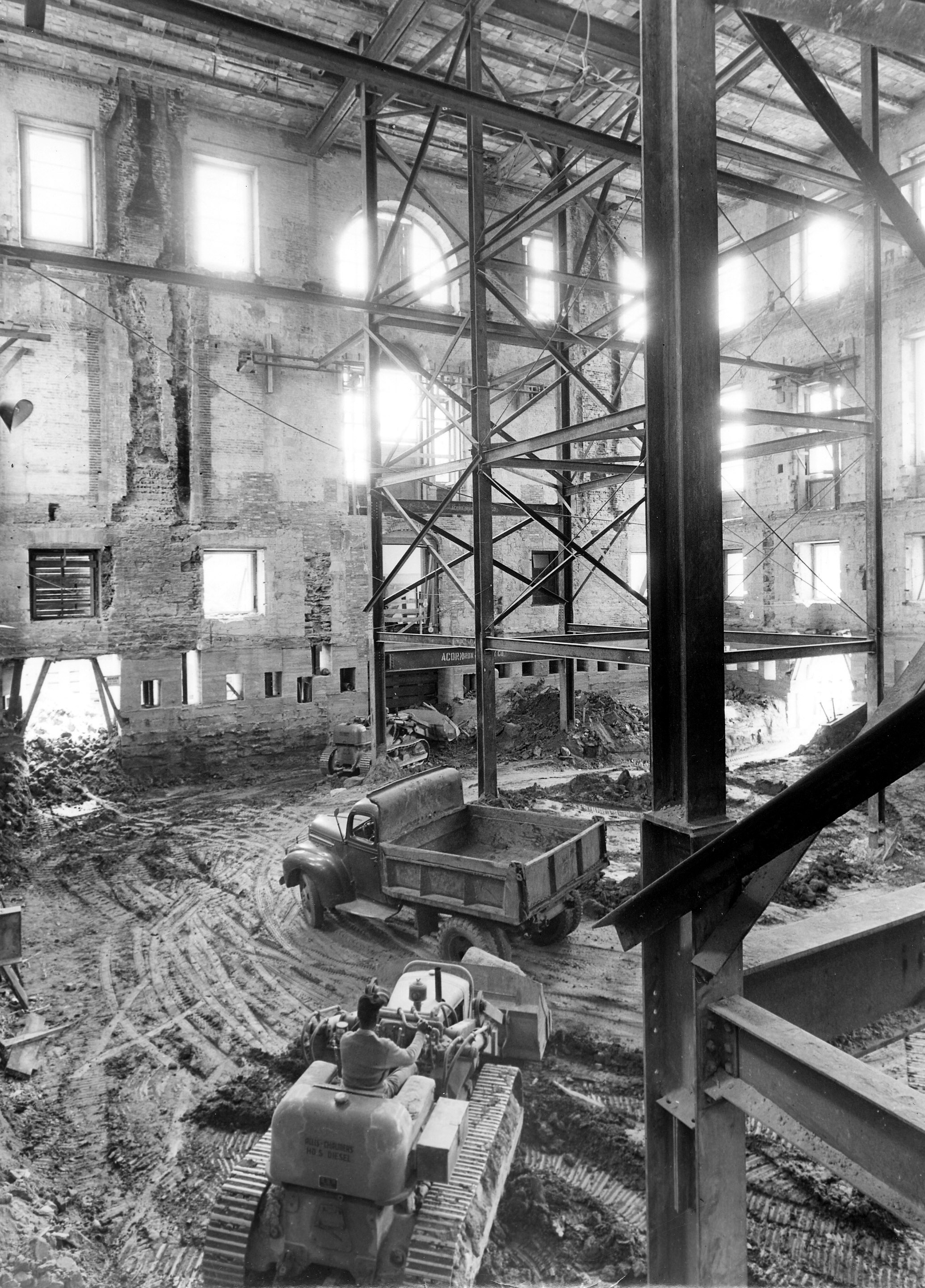
The gutted interior of the White House, May 1950

The White House Reconstruction, also known as the Truman Reconstruction, was a comprehensive dismantling and rebuilding of the interior of the White House from 1949 to 1952. In 1948, after nearly a century and a half of wartime destruction and rebuilding, hurried renovations, additions of new services, technologies, the expanded third floor, and inadequate foundations, architectural and engineering investigations found that the Executive Residence portion of the White House Complex was facing near-imminent collapse, and it was deemed unsafe for occupancy. President Harry S. Truman, his family, and the entire residence staff were relocated across the street to Blair House, and over the next three years, the White House was gutted, expanded, and rebuilt.

== Emerging problem ==
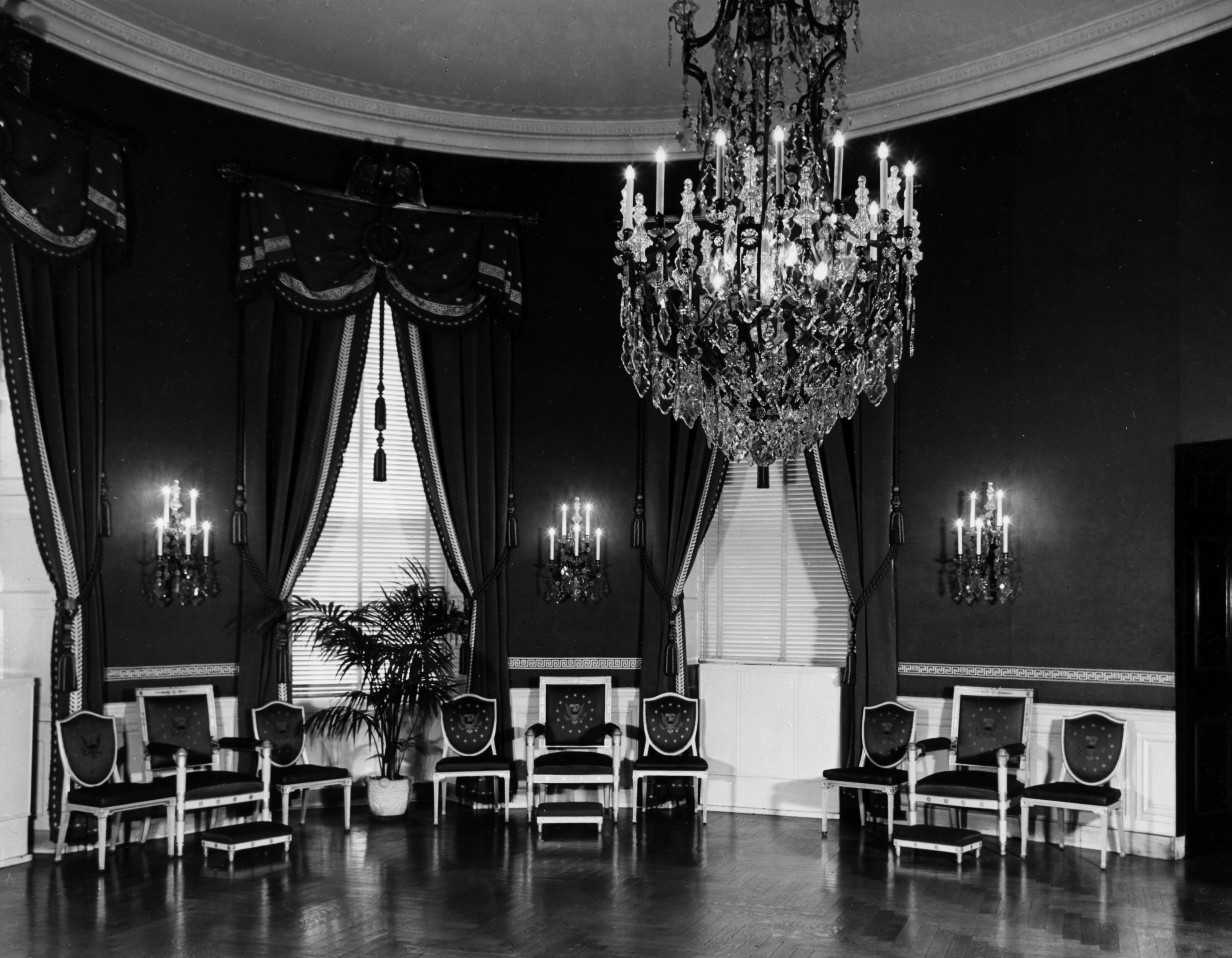
The Blue Room in 1945, with the chandelier that swayed

When the Trumans moved into the executive mansion in 1945, they found it badly in need of repair after twelve years of neglect during the Great Depression and World War II. In 1946, Congress authorized $780,000 (equal to $12,877,986 today) for repairs. The mansion's heaving floors and mysterious sounds had been known by staff and first families for many years. For the first two years of his presidency, according to White House photographer Abbie Rowe, President Truman heard "ghosts" roaming the halls of the second floor residence. Government agencies had expressed concern about the condition of the building, including a 1941 report from the Army Corps of Engineers warning of failing wood structure, crumbling masonry, and major fire hazards. The report was dismissed by President Franklin D. Roosevelt.

In early 1946, during a formal reception in the Blue Room, the First Lady noticed the very large crystal chandelier overhead swaying and its crystals tinkling. The floor of the Oval Study above moved noticeably when walked on, and a valet was then attending the president while he was taking a bath. Truman described a potential scenario of him in his bathtub falling through the floor into the midst of a Daughters of the American Revolution tea "wearing nothing more than his reading glasses." In early 1947, a "stretching" chandelier in the East Room and another swaying in the Oval Study caused further alarm. "Floors no longer merely creaked; they swayed."

=== Investigations ===
The Public Buildings Administration was asked to investigate the condition of the White House, but no action was taken until January 1948. After the commissioner of the Public Buildings Administration, which had responsibility for the White House, noticed the Blue Room chandelier swaying overhead during another crowded reception, he and the White House architect conducted their own on-site investigation the next day. They discovered split and gouged-out beams supporting the ceiling and second floor above. He reported "that the beams are staying up there from force of habit only." The number of occupants in the second floor was restricted, temporary fixes were made to some of the beams, and scaffolding-type supports were erected throughout the first family's second floor living quarters.

On January 30, 1948, the president received a confidential report from the Commissioner of Public Buildings warning of the "imminent collapse" of the second floor of the mansion. In February, the president invited the president of the American Institute of Architects, Douglas Orr, and the president of the American Society of Civil Engineers, Richard E. Dougherty, to "make a structural survey of the safety of the White House". Their one-day investigation concluded with a report issued that same day which said the second floor structure was a fire hazard and was in danger of collapse.

They recommended that the second floor should be reconstructed as soon as possible, electricity use be cut to a minimum, and that further investigations be undertaken. Congress provided $50,000 for a more thorough investigation. Additional engineers and other professionals were engaged from the private sector. Walls, ceilings, and floors were opened up to provide access to the investigators.

=== Collapse ===
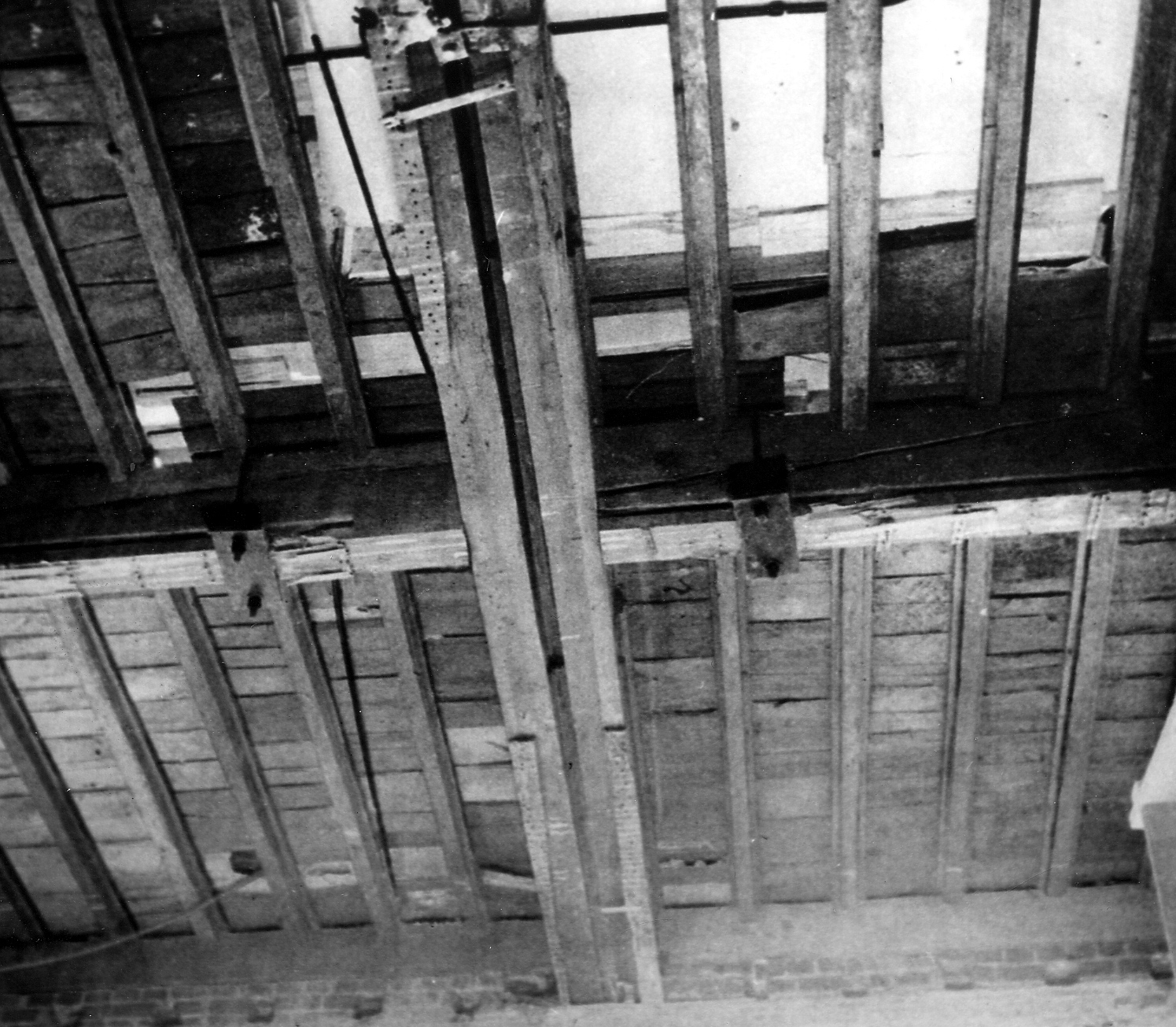
A split beam supporting the second floor under Margaret Truman's Sitting Room, 1949

In June 1948, a leg of Margaret Truman's piano crashed through the floor in her second floor sitting room and through the ceiling of the Family Dining Room below. Investigators found the floor boards had rotted, the main floor beam was split completely through, and the ceiling below had dropped 18 inches (46 cm). The investigators determined that the west end of the second floor was sinking.

The first family was relocated from the west to the east end of the floor. Steel bracing was added to support the second floor and ceilings throughout the residence. The investigation concluded that the problem was a collapsing building, not just a floor, and "heroic remedies" would be required.

That year was an election year and the president feared that news of the collapsing White House would serve as an unflattering metaphor for his administration. On September 30, 1948, the White House Architect announced that the White House's "structural nerves" had been damaged, the second floor would need to be rebuilt, but that overall the building was in "good shape". He estimated the cost of repairs might be $1 million.

The on-site forensic investigations continued while the first family was away campaigning. In October, the ceiling of the East Room began to collapse and required wood supports. The structure under the Grand Staircase was found to be crumbling. The president's bathtub had begun sinking into the floor. The investigators discovered that the foundations of the interior walls supporting the upper floors and roof were all but non-existent.

As they sank into the ground, the interior walls and floors were pulling away from the exterior walls leaving large gaps. They determined that the interior of the house was sinking and in danger of collapsing inward; the entire mansion was unsafe, except for the new Truman Balcony.

Upon returning to the White House the day after winning the election, the president was informed by the Federal Works Agency that he would need to vacate the White House so critical repairs could be made. On November 7, 1948, the news was made public. The Trumans departed town and within two weeks the White House was vacated. Furniture, staff, and the first family moved into Blair House, the President's guest house, across Pennsylvania Avenue.

=== Contributing factors ===
There were multiple contributing factors that led to the White House's pending collapse in 1948, including original and subsequent design flaws, improper materials, multiple small and major renovations carried out by many presidents to accommodate differing tastes, needs, and advances in technologies. Collectively, they were described as a "slow murder" of the White House.

Fire: In August 1814, the White House was gutted by a fire set by British troops during the Burning of Washington in the War of 1812. Only a heavy rainstorm prevented the entire structure from being destroyed. By 1817, the building had been rebuilt. Key portions of the scorched wooden structure were re-used.

Services: Technological advances in heating, plumbing, lighting, communications, and elevators were all added into the White House during its first century-and-a-half. When the White House was constructed, it had no indoor plumbing, on-site running water, fire fighting systems, electricity, or communications systems. Many of these were cut through major structural supports, including reducing wooden beams from 14 inches (36 cm) to 2 inches (5.1 cm) thickness. Earlier systems that became obsolete, such as old water pipes, gas pipes for lights, and forced-air heating ducts, were abandoned in place, adding significant weight to the building.

1902 renovation: In 1902, President Theodore Roosevelt engaged architect Charles F. McKim of McKim, Mead, and White for a major renovation. In addition to adding a "temporary" West Wing and upgrading interior finishes, the work included adding bathrooms, removing the west stair, expanding the second floor West Sitting Hall, and expanding the State Dining Room. This involved removing a load-bearing wall which had supported the floor and walls above and then hanging them from the existing attic (later third floor) and roof structure. Many structural deficiencies were noted and partially addressed in what McKim termed a "nip and tuck".

Third floor addition: In 1927, President Coolidge engaged architect William Adams Delano to design and add a concrete and steel third floor under a rebuilt roof. The original roof and attic floor were supported only on the heavy exterior walls. This renovation transferred much of their weight onto the interior walls which by 1948 began to fail. Bathrooms added to this new floor were outfitted with second-hand pipes that over the following years leaked and caused water damage on the floors below.

Construction flaws: The interior supporting walls were made of brick without proper foundations, unlike the thick exterior sandstone walls supported on relatively deep and wide foundations. By 1948, the interior walls were settling significantly into the underlying clay soils and thin rubble base, causing them to pull away from the exterior walls. In time, the exterior walls would have been pulled in and collapsed. The structural integrity of the marble grand staircase was found to be in 'imminent danger' during the 1948 Congressional survey. In the 1880s, secondhand bricks had been acquired for the staircase's supporting structure and were 'disintegrating' beneath it by 1948. This was a notable safety concern as the White House had only one small elevator at the time and the grand staircase supported significant human traffic.

Schedule: A contributing factor common to most of this work was a rushed schedule. Presidents facing a four-year term didn't have the time, and in many cases, the patience, needed for proper design and construction. For the 1902 renovation, President Theodore Roosevelt allowed just four months.

=== Project definition ===
By late 1948, three main options were considered for replacement of the White House:

- Demolish and rebuild the interior, keeping the exterior walls intact.
- Demolish the building entirely and construct a new executive mansion.
- Demolish the building entirely, salvage the exterior walls and rebuild them and a new interior.

During 1949, the investigations were completed, the architectural and engineering design was finalized, and cost estimates concluded that the early estimate of $1 million was inadequate. In addition to simply replacing the interior, the mansion was to be modernized, the third floor expanded, two basement levels added, and there would be a major expansion of underground spaces for air conditioning and other services. The total number of rooms was nearly doubled to 132.

There was significant debate among congressional committee members considering the project, including many in Congress who were outwardly hostile toward the president. Both Trumans lobbied in favor of preserving the exterior walls intact. Eleanor Roosevelt wrote a newspaper column advocating for its preservation, and the White House Architect also expressed his support.

The desire to seek the most economic solution was weighed against the costs of maintaining the White House's historic presence. In the autumn of 1949, Congress authorized funding of $5.4 million ($61.4 million in 2021 dollars) for the entire project to reconstruct the White House while keeping the exterior walls in place.

== Key participants ==
=== Commission on the Renovation of the Executive Mansion ===
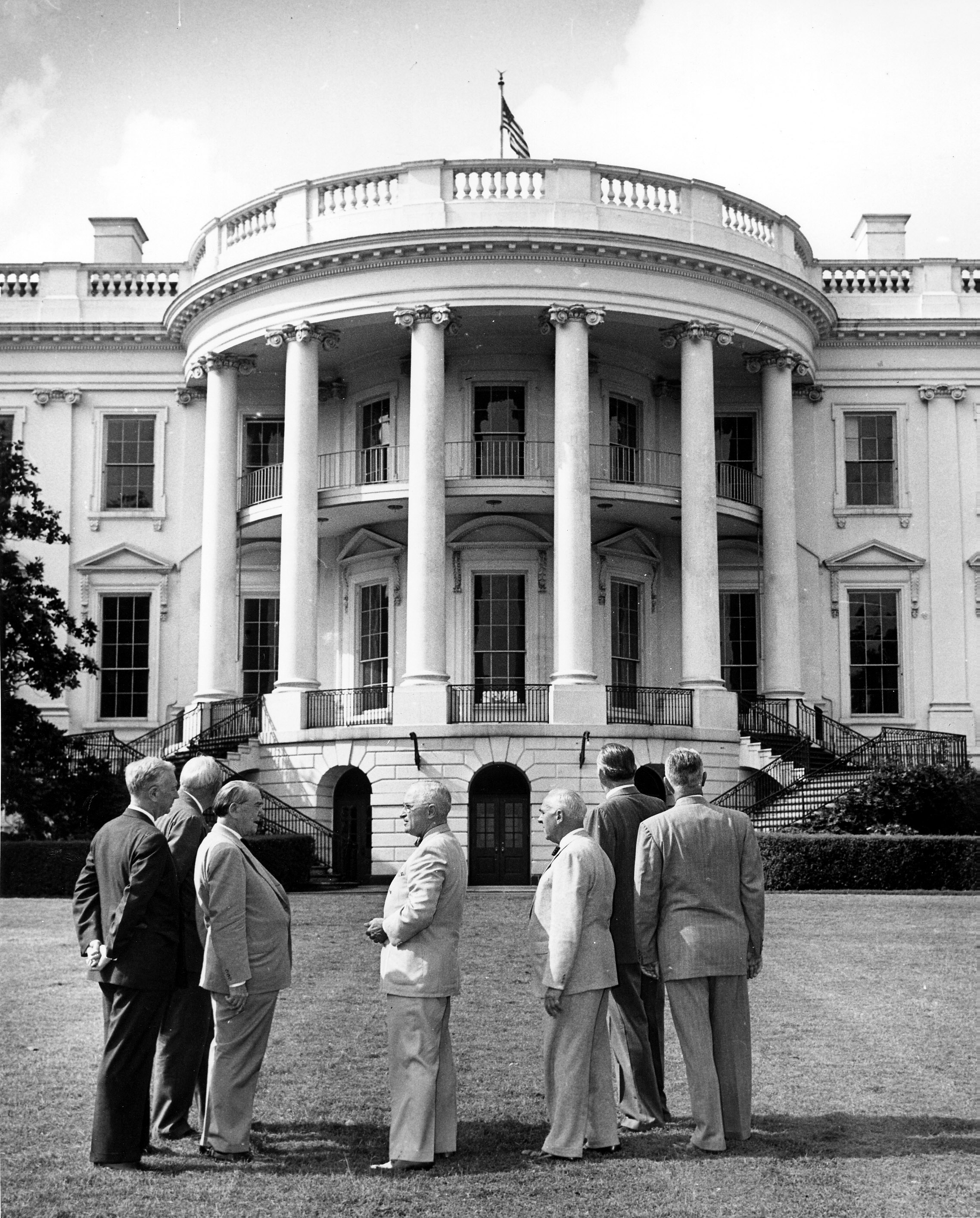
President Truman and the Commission on the Renovation of the Executive Mansion, 1949

Congress created the Commission on the Renovation of the Executive Mansion following the March 1949 recommendation of the president. It was granted authority to act on behalf of the federal government in the execution of the project, including responsibility for the White House and its site. It was composed of six men: two each appointed by the president, the Senate, and the House of Representatives.

The president appointed American Institute of Architects president Douglas Orr and American Society of Civil Engineers president Richard E. Dougherty. Additional members of the commission were Senator Kenneth D. McKellar (chairman), Senator Edward Martin, Representative J. Harry McGregor, and Representative Louis C. Rabaut. Supporting them were a team of consulting architects, engineers, and contractors. It continued its work until October 1952.

=== Fine Arts Commission ===
The United States Commission of Fine Arts (CFA) had approving authority for most of the design work, including interiors. Advising the commission was architect William Adams Delano of the New York firm of Delano and Aldrich, former chair of the commission, and architect of the 1927 third floor addition and advisor for the 1946 Truman Balcony. The CFA was granted congressional authority to review, but did not have formal authority. President Truman had all but ignored them after they rejected his balcony, but their opinion carried significant weight with public and congressional opinion and so their approval was sought for major design decisions of the reconstruction project.

=== Truman ===
While the commission was in overall charge of the project, Truman was a highly influential participant from early design and throughout all stages of construction. Truman was a man of strong opinions relating to architecture and history, and in directing the work he made his presence felt.

=== Architect ===
Lorenzo Winslow, the White House architect, was employed by the Public Works Administration. He had been in the position since it was created for him by President Franklin Roosevelt. In 1933 Winslow won a competition to design a White House swimming pool. He maintained a close working relationship with President Truman throughout his administration.

=== Project manager ===
The commission selected General Glen Edgar Edgerton as the overall manager of the project. His experience included selecting the route of the Panama Canal and constructing the Alaska Highway during World War II. He began work for the commission in July 1949, just before they made the decision on reconstruction.

=== Contractor ===
The general contractor was John McShain Inc., headed by John McShain, the "Builder of Washington" who had constructed (among other works) the Jefferson Memorial, the Pentagon, and the FDR Library at Hyde Park. McShain's on-site construction manager was Paul Hauck.

== Reconstruction ==
The scope of the project involved the complete removal of the interior of the White House, except for the third floor, and included salvage and storage of critical interior elements, excavation of new basement levels, and construction of new foundations, steel and concrete structure, masonry interior walls with plaster finish and wood paneling, custom plaster moldings, refurbished and replacement windows, and new heating, ventilation, air conditioning, plumbing, electrical, and communications systems.

The bulk of the work was to be accomplished within the exterior stone walls which were to be kept in place and repainted. Landscaping around the house was to be replaced. All workers were subjected to security clearance by the Secret Service. The West Wing was to be kept fully operational and occupied by the president and his staff. All work was to be completed for a total cost of $5.4 million and completed by late 1951, in 660 days, approximately 22 months.

=== Changes in design ===
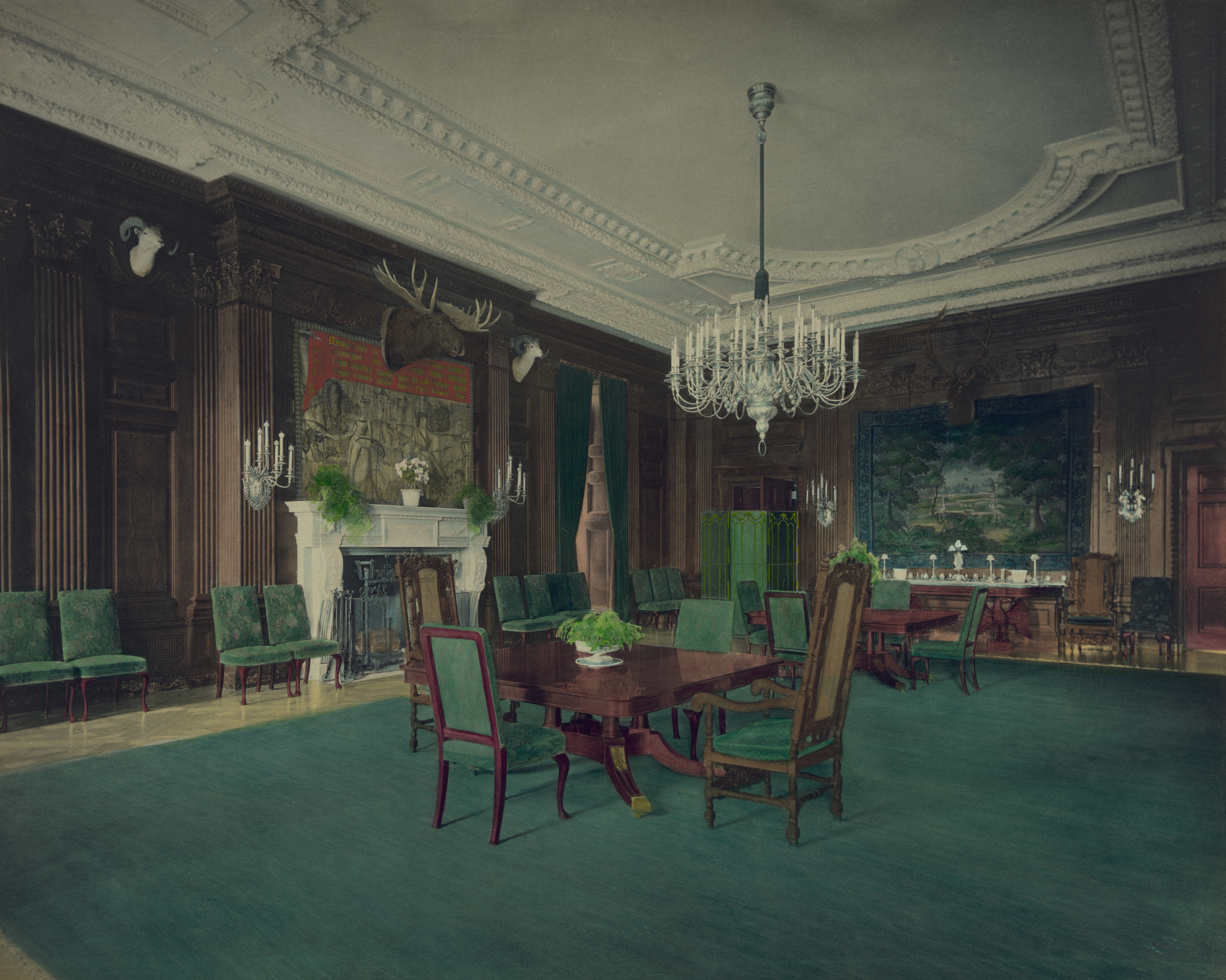
The State Dining Room after the 1902 Roosevelt renovation with the pre-reconstruction paneling

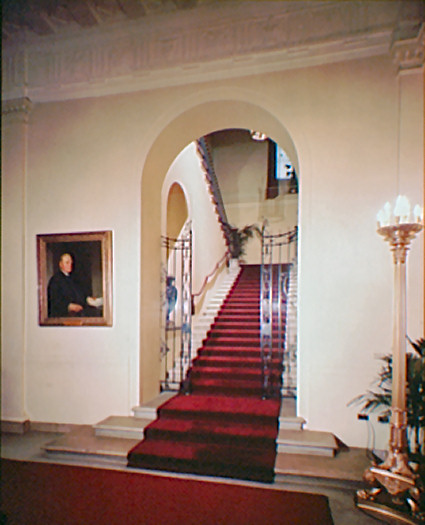
The Grand Stair from the Cross Hall. During the reconstruction it was revised to open into the Entrance Hall with a landing at this end

The rooms of the state floor were reconstructed with few significant changes. The second floor rooms were adjusted to provide built-in closets and additional bathrooms, but otherwise were rebuilt largely as they had been. The third floor was expanded and the rooftop solarium replaced. Two new basement levels were added under the ground floor.

The most noticeable change to the state floor was revising the Grand Stair to discharge eastward into the Entrance Hall to provide a more ceremonial procession from the upstairs. The opening to the south was kept with a railing providing a balcony-type overview into the Cross Hall. On the second floor, the rooms above the East Room were lowered due to a thinner, yet stronger, steel floor structure. This allowed access from the Center Hall via a short ramp in a central passageway that was narrowed to accommodate an additional service stair and added closets. Additions to the ground floor included additional service elevators to service the upper floors, a bowling alley, expanded kitchen, broadcast studio, barber shop, medical and dental clinics, carpentry and upholstery shops, and large service and equipment spaces.

The style Winslow selected for the interior finishes of the re-created main public rooms was the Federal style from the 1800-1820 period of President James Monroe's rebuilding. This was a reversal from the variety of styles added in the previous 120 years. Winslow incorporated more marble flooring and paneling for aesthetics and ease of maintenance. Some changes requested by the Trumans, such as brightening the State Dining Room by painting the dark wood paneling "Federalist" celadon green, were also popular in the mid-20th Century.

=== Bidding and delivery ===
In September, 1949 the commission invited bids from interested general contractors. Screening for required experience and capacity was undertaken by each bidder having to complete a detailed questionnaire. The construction delivery method, or type of construction contract, was a "fixed-fee-cost-plus", meaning the work would be performed for the cost of the materials and labor plus a fixed fee for the general contractor's overhead and profit. On October 28, 1949, the General Services Administration received bids from 15 general contractors ranging up to $950,000 for fees. The low bid was for $100,000 from John McShain Inc.; by the end of the project, he had reportedly lost approximately $200,000, bringing his total costs for supervision, management, and other overhead to around $300,000.

=== Construction ===
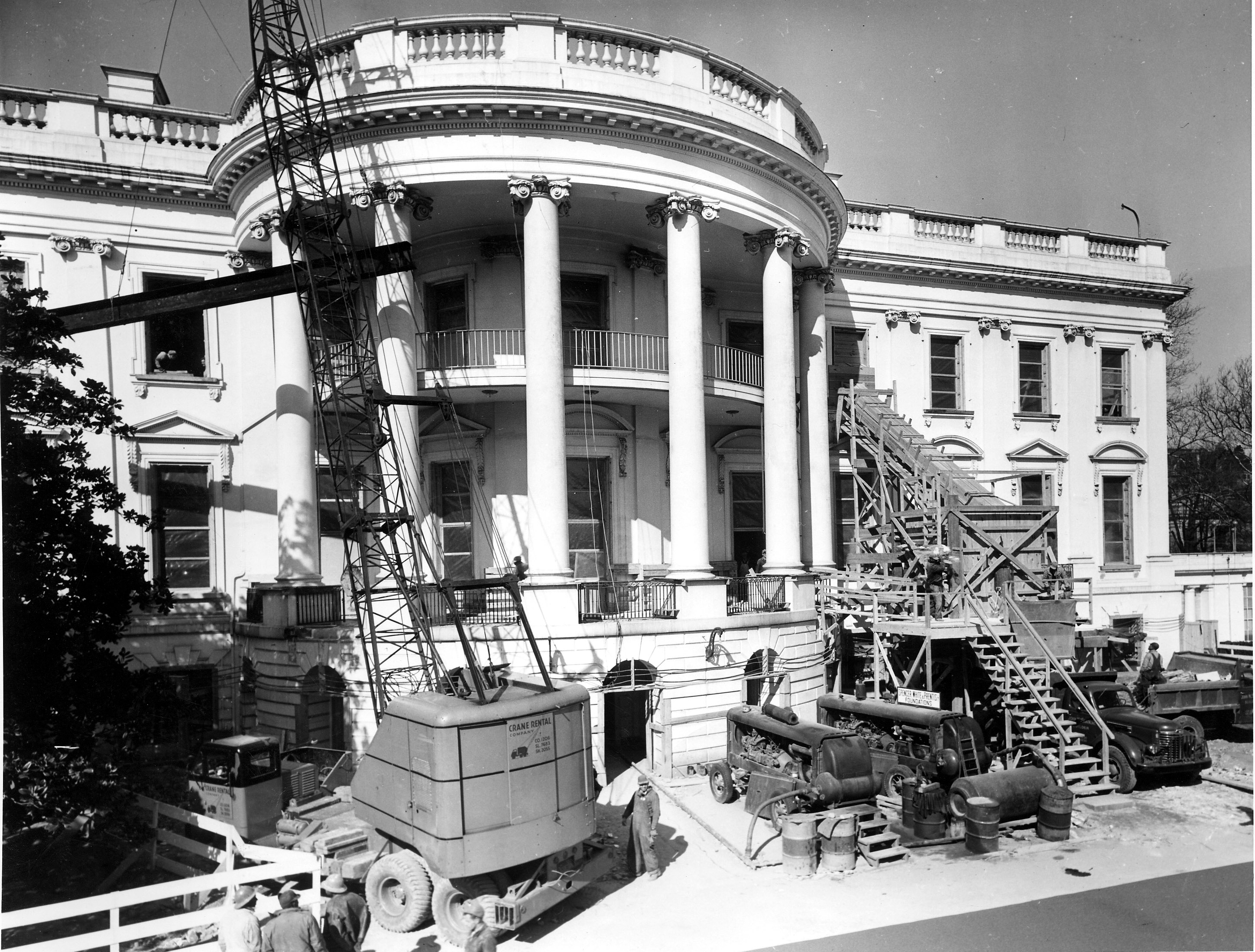
Removing debris from the interior, February 1950

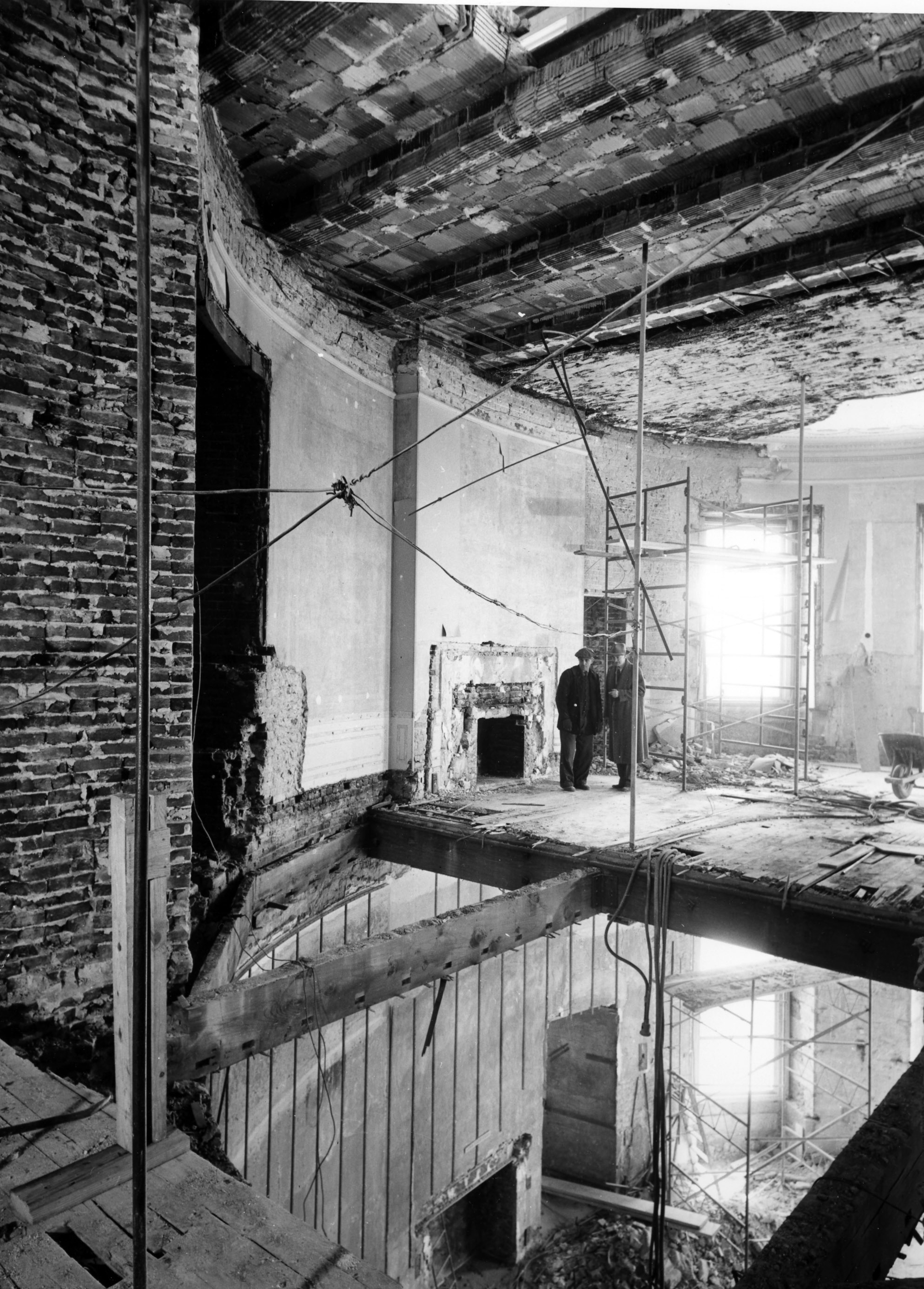
Demolition of the Second Floor Oval Study and the Blue Room below, March 1950

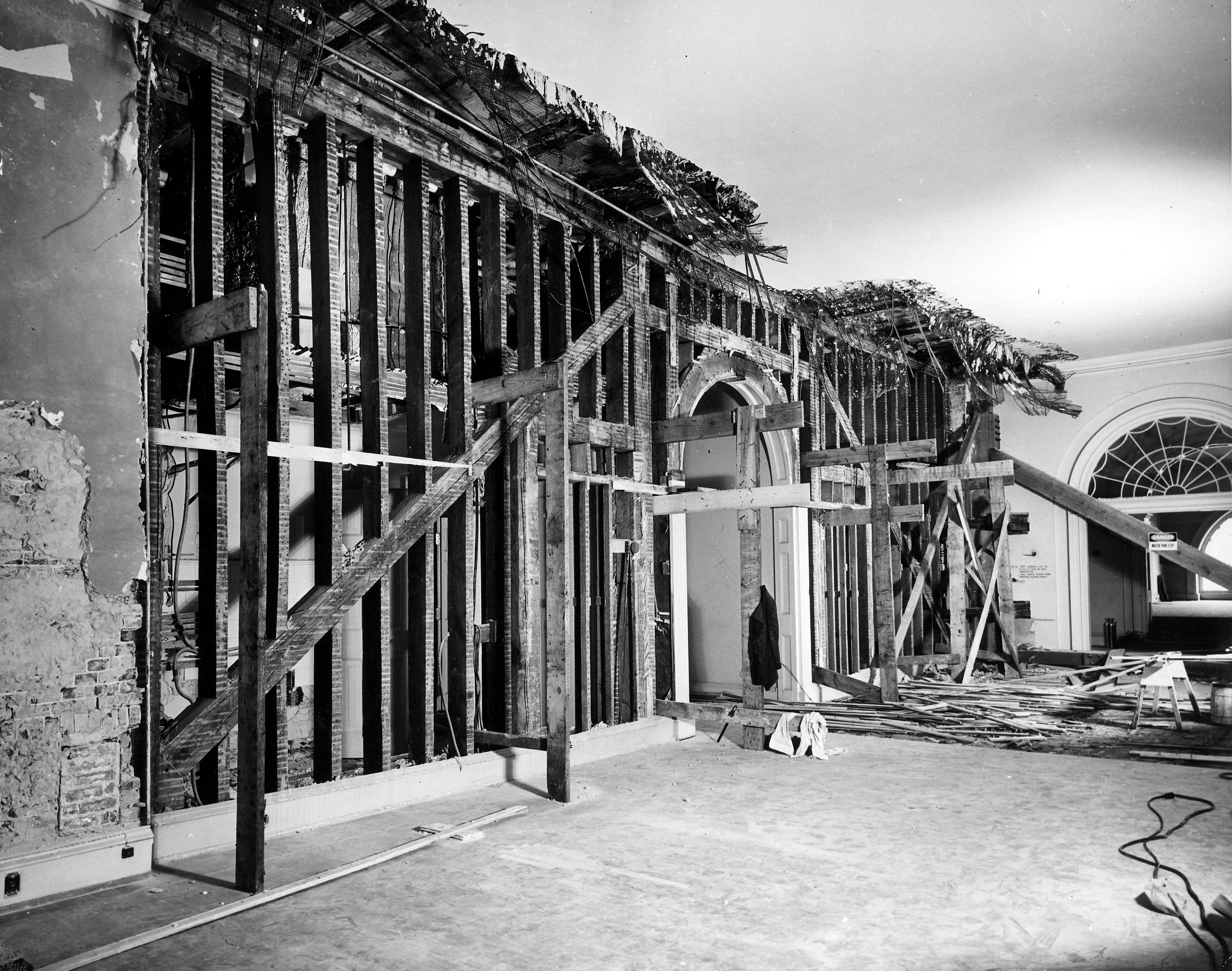
Demolition on the second floor, January 1950

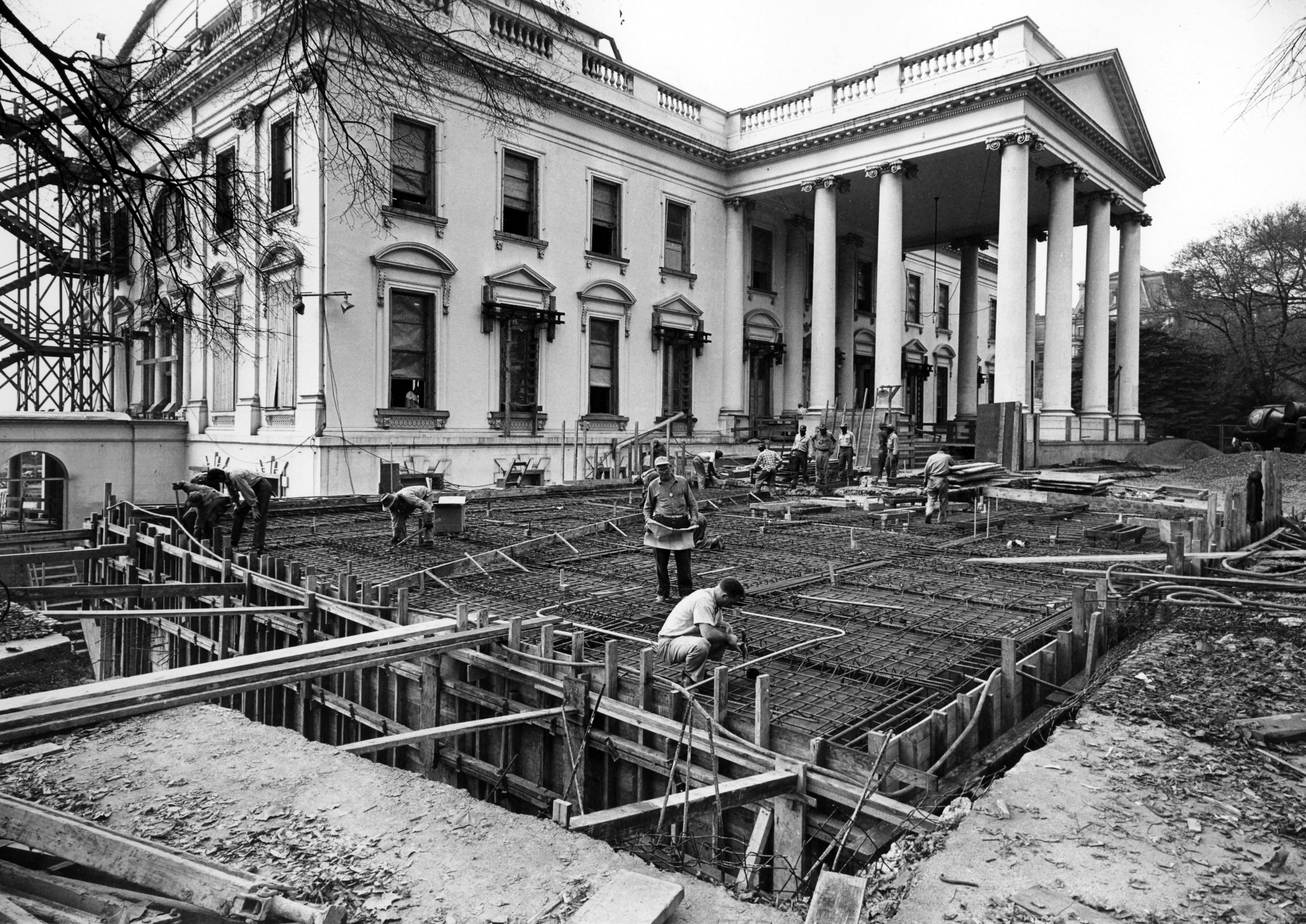
Construction of underground service and utility spaces by the northeast corner of the mansion, November 1950

On December 13, 1949, construction work began on site. There was no groundbreaking or commencement ceremony. Security fencing went around the work area and a solid screen provided privacy for the West Wing. Temporary sheds and buildings were erected on the South Lawn. By March 20, 1950, the removal of historic material slated for salvage had been completed. New underpinning foundations extending down 20 feet (6 m) were hand dug under the existing exterior walls, to increase their load bearing capability. Interior steel shoring was added to brace the exterior walls and support the existing third floor and roof.

Demolition began with much of the material removed from the interior via chutes through window openings and by wheelbarrow. By mid-1950 the White House exterior was essentially a shell encompassing over one million cubic feet (28,000 m^{3}) of mostly empty space. By October the new, permanent steel structure was in place and construction of suspended concrete floors to replace the former wood and masonry structure began. For the following year-and-a-half, the new interior walls, doors, windows, wiring, pipes, services, and finishes were constructed.

=== Key challenges ===
From the outset the reconstruction project faced significant challenges. Access to the area of work was highly restricted, both by security, the occupied West Wing, and by the exterior stone walls which had to remain in place. The logistics of construction were complex; it was described as needing to "balance a stone house in the sky" while new foundations were dug beneath its walls.

The architect was often behind in providing key drawings, specifications, and reviews to the contractor, in part due to delays in obtaining numerous approvals from the commission. There were almost no record drawings showing the existing construction, which required added investigations and details to be developed during construction. In 1950, the Korean War brought inflation and shortages of key materials and labor.

=== Protective measures ===
The biggest change during construction was announced on August 1, 1950, when the president authorized a separate and highly secret project. Project 9 was officially described as "certain protective measures" to be added to the new basement: an underground shelter to resist attack from an atomic bomb. It was designed by the same architect and contractor as the main project and installed under the East Terrace and the garden to the south, between the mansion and the East Wing.

Access was through the northeast corner of the new basement level. This additional construction included major excavation, heavy concrete reinforcement of the mansion's basement, upgrading the existing air raid shelter, and dismantling much of the East Terrace and colonnade. Inside the mansion a heavily reinforced concrete tunnel to connect the West and East Wings was added through the middle of the new basement, which complicated and delayed the main construction.

=== Preservation ===
Historic preservation of buildings during this time was not as strict or defined as it became later. For its time, simply not demolishing the entire structure was deemed "preservation". Winslow envisioned many of the interior items – from doors, trim, woodwork, and ornamental plaster – would be reused. Most were carefully dismantled, labelled, catalogued, and stored. Much of the paneling was reinstalled in the main public rooms, but other historic elements were simply copied to accommodate increasing cost and time constraints. Many of the original materials that were not deemed of significantly identifiable historic value, such as marble fireplace mantels, or not deemed to be readily reused, such as pipes, were sent to landfills.

To avoid profiteering from the millions of items being carted away from the work site, the project ran a highly publicized souvenir program. Prior to its establishment in January 1951, over 20,000 requests were made for everything from nails to charred wood. Under the program, people could request an order form. From a warehouse, pre-assembled kits were distributed for as little as 25 cents. The kits included items such as an individual brick, nearly a ton of stone, or special paperweights. The program ended in October 1951 and reported a profit of over $10,000.

=== Interior finishes and furnishings ===
During the very hasty move-out from the White House in late 1948, the B. Altman and Company department store offered to move and store the more valuable White House furnishings in their climate-controlled warehouses, for a nominal sum. The government deemed it to be "in the interests of the United States" and therefore not subject to public bidding requirements. The store later offered their interior design, decorating, and furniture supply services at true cost with no profit or ability to advertise the work. The government also deemed this to be in the public interest.

=== Budget and schedule ===
Cost escalations due to labor shortages and wartime inflation caused an expected cost overrun of $321,000. Congress agreed to fund $261,000, bringing the total cost of the project to $5.7 million. The difference was made by cutting into other areas, including the budget for furniture and interiors. The secret bomb shelter cost $881,000 but was funded out of a separate fund controlled by the president.

The original schedule called for the work to be finished in late 1951. By the end of 1950 the contractor estimated it would take until 1952. John McShain encountered the president at a football game on January 1, 1951, and jokingly told the president he would be in the White House that summer. The president took him seriously, announced it publicly, and invited Princess Elizabeth to visit in the autumn. The state visit occurred, but not in the (unfinished) White House. In early 1952 the president directed that the work needed to be complete by early April in time for a state visit by Queen Juliana of the Netherlands. Soon afterwards he announced he would be returning to the White House two weeks earlier than previously stated.

== Completion and aftermath ==
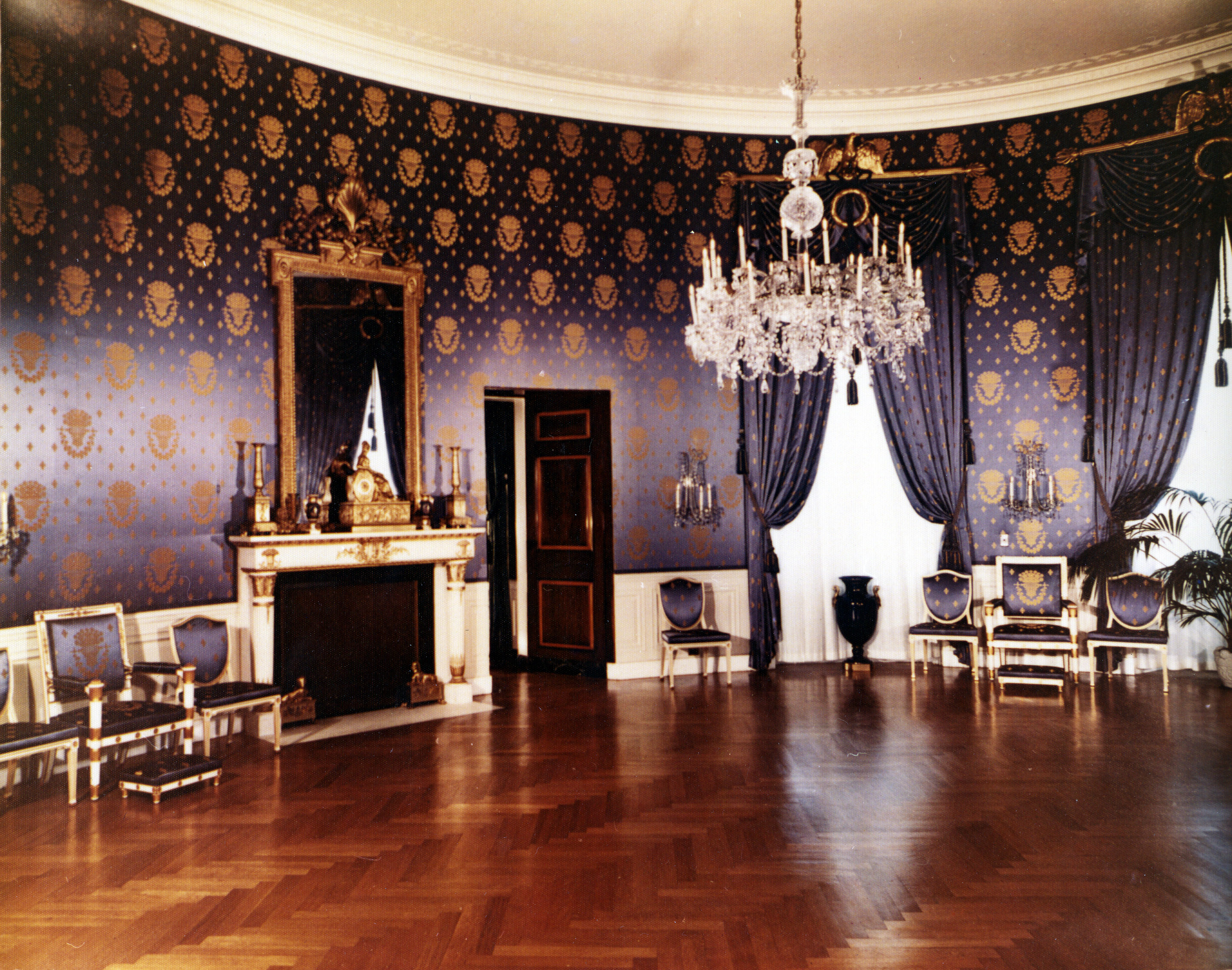
The Blue Room after the reconstruction, 1952

The first family returned to the White House on the evening of March 27, 1952. It was ready for its residents, but the work was not complete. Deficiencies included the main kitchen not being operable in time for a state visit; some rooms without electrical outlets; drafty fireplaces rendering rooms unfit to sleep in; and kitchen sinks found to be too small for the dinner service.

The project had to suit the needs of the modern presidency while retaining the symbolism of the nation's pre-eminent historic home, adhering to a historical style or period, and working on a very tight budget. Prior to the reconstruction, the greatest historical link was through the house itself; the furnishings and most artwork were from recent decades. The reconstruction retained the historic exterior but removed most of the interior's link to the past. One columnist observed, "When those floors creaked, you knew Lincoln had been walking there before you." The reconstructed interiors were described as "stark", reminding Eleanor Roosevelt of a hotel.

The Trumans both lobbied Congress to preserve the exterior of the White House and, like the Eisenhowers and Kennedys who followed them, were not pleased with the lack of historical furniture. Before departing office, President Truman attempted to obtain an additional $50,000 from Congress for more suitable furniture, but was unsuccessful. Jacqueline Kennedy's restoration a decade later sought to restore this link through the return of historic furnishings, artwork, and interior details. Bess Truman was responsible for creating the Lincoln Bedroom by compiling into one room Lincoln's famous bed and other furniture from the time of his administration that had been discovered and restored by the Trumans.

To bring the White House's history closer to the people, President Truman conducted the first television tour of the White House on April 22, 1952, and opened the mansion to public tours; previously tours were only by way of congressional appointments.

Presidential families and staff benefited greatly from the installation of air conditioning. Previously, the operations of the White House and West Wing were significantly reduced in summertime as first families and official staff fled the heat and humidity of the capital for cooler climates. After the reconstruction, the White House could operate year-round without regard for summer heat.

Neither the commission nor the president were satisfied with the work of the general contractor. When the commission published its official account of the project, it described the work of nearly everyone of significance to the project, except the general contractor, whose name was all but omitted. President Truman publicly expressed praise for the completed work, but the night of his return to the White House he wrote in his private diary: "With all the trouble and worry it is worth it – but not 5½ million dollars! if I could have had charge of the construction it would have been done for half the money and in half the time!"
