= Daniel Colling =

- Born: 1 January 1946; Lunéville, Meurthe-et-Moselle, France
- Died: 28 January 2025 (aged 79); Neuilly-sur-Seine, France
- Resting place: Père Lachaise Cemetery, Paris
- Citizenship: France
- Occupations: Concert promoter, festival director, music industry executive
- Years active: 1970–2025
- Known for: Co-founding the Printemps de Bourges (1977)
- Awards: Officer of the Legion of Honour; Commandeur of the Ordre des Arts et des Lettres (2001)

Daniel Colling , (May 31, 1946 - January 27, 2025) , is a French entrepreneur and artistic director, co-founder of the Printemps de Bourges. He was awarded the National Order of the Legion of Honourin in 2004.

== Biography ==
Daniel Colling's family were Alsatians that were exiled to Lorraine after the defeat of 1870. He became known as a tour and concert organizer after settling in Paris in January 1970. He created the Société Civile Écoute s'il pleut in 1976 with Maurice Frot (secretary of Léo Ferré), Daniel Bornet (manager of Malicorne), Jean-Pierre Moreau (Le Vrai Chic parisien) and Dominique Mouyeaux, manager and producer of Mahjun. Together they organized and managed the tours of artists such as Malicorne, Jacques Higelin and Bernard Lavilliers.

In 1977, he founded the Printemps de Bourges festival.

He chaired the National Center for Song, Variety and Jazz, from October 2002 to May 14, 2009.

In 2004, he was awarded the National Order of the Legion of Honourin.

He died on January 27, 2025, at age of 78.
