= Charles Wiley Doherty =

American politician

Member of the Mississippi House of Representatives from the Tunica County district
- In office January 1904 – January 1912
- Succeeded by: James M. Anderson

Personal details
- Born: January 5, 1857 Jackson, Mississippi, U.S.
- Died: December 11, 1934 (aged 77) Phoenix, Arizona, U.S.
- Party: Democratic

Charles Wiley Doherty (January 5, 1857 – December 11, 1934) was a Democratic member of the Mississippi House of Representatives, representing Tunica County, from 1904 to 1912.

== Biography ==
Charles Wiley Doherty was born on January 5, 1857, in Jackson, Mississippi. His parents were Paul Manson Doherty and Mary (O'Sullivan) Doherty. He was of Irish descent. He was a telegraph operator and cotton planter by profession. He was elected to the Mississippi House of Representatives to represent Tunica County as a Democrat in 1903. He was re-elected in 1907. Afterwards, he became a consul at Cartagena, Colombia, and at Mexicali, Mexico. He died on December 11, 1934, in Phoenix, Arizona.

== Personal life ==
He was a Catholic. He married Meta White in 1883. They had two children: Annette Longstreet Doherty and Clark White Doherty.
