= Printemps de Bourges =

Annual music festival in Bourges, France

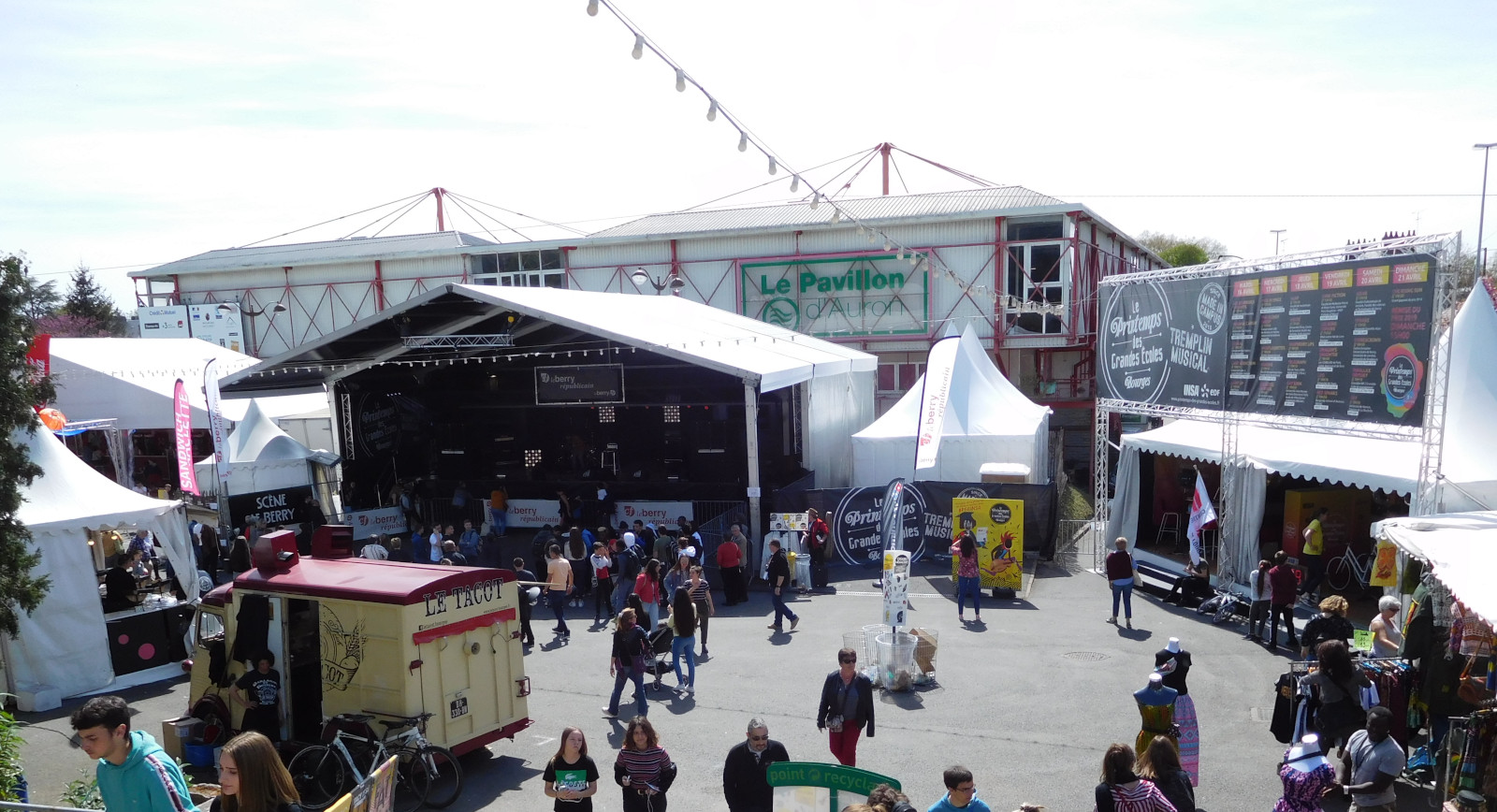
- Printemps de Bourges, 2019
- Genre: Electronic music, etc.
- Locations: Bourges, France
- Years active: 1977–present
- Website: printemps-bourges.com/en

The Printemps de Bourges (French pronunciation: [pʁɛ̃tɑ̃ də buʁʒ], lit. 'Spring of Bourges') is an annual music festival that is held in Bourges, France, over the course of five days. It is now a major event in France and Europe.

== History ==
The festival was created in 1977 (by Daniel Colling, Alain Meilland, and Maurice Frot). With its span of 35 years, its history reflects musical trends and evolution over time. Every springtime, thousands of spectators come from all parts of France and foreign countries to see an eclectic variety of concerts. The festival encompasses some 60 shows, with over 200 artists on 13 stages within a week; these shows represent diverse genres, and both well-known artists and young musical talents. The ever-growing public is composed primarily of young people (91% are under 35), and over 200,000 people attend the festival each year. Music professionals (over 600 each year) are present to recruit new talents. The festival also attracts media professionals (press, TV, radio), numbering over 500 each year. A parallel festival is hosted in the city, called Les Découvertes du Printemps de Bourges; its aim is to showcase the talents of new artists. Many bars and restaurants also host a multitude of gigs through a partnership with le Printemps de Bourges.

=== COVID-19 pandemic ===
On 13 March 2020, the festival announced that the 2020 edition of the festival would be cancelled because of the COVID-19 pandemic.

The 2021 edition was rescheduled from April to June, and events were greatly cut back, to comply with public health restrictions.

== See also ==
- List of historic rock festivals
- Live Printemps de Bourges 2002, by Jean-Michel Jarre
