= Daugherty =

Daugherty may refer to:

== People with the surname ==
- Amira Daugherty, American rapper and singer
- Billy Joe Daugherty (1952-2009), American founder and pastor of Victory Christian Center
- Brad Daugherty, American basketball player
- Brad Daugherty, professional poker player
- Chris Daugherty, American construction worker and reality television personality
- Derri Daugherty, American record producer, songwriter, guitarist and singer
- Duffy Daugherty, American football coach
- George Daugherty, American-born conductor and music director
- Gordon Daugherty, American computer scientist
- Harry M. Daugherty (1860-1941), American politician
- Herschel Daugherty, American actor and television director
- James Daugherty, American author and illustrator
- James Alexander Daugherty (1847–1920), politician
- Jay Dee Daugherty, American drummer
- Jennifer Daugherty (1979–2010), Greensburg, Pennsylvania murder victim
- Jerome Daugherty (1849–1914), American Jesuit and president of Georgetown University
- Michael Daugherty, composer
- Patricia Daugherty, American management scientist
- Patrick M. Daugherty (1928-1997), American politician

== Places ==
=== United States ===
- Daugherty, Missouri
- Daugherty Township, Beaver County, Pennsylvania
- Dougherty, Rains County, Texas

== See also ==
- Dougherty (disambiguation)
