= Dougherty, Georgia =

Unincorporated community in Georgia, U.S.

Coordinates: 34°22′56″N 84°03′54″W

Dougherty is an unincorporated community in Dawson County, in the U.S. state of Georgia.

== History ==
A post office called Dougherty was established in 1881, and remained in operation until 1955. A variant name was "Savannah". According to one tradition, the community was named after Cornelius Dougherty, a local colonial Irish merchant, while another tradition states the settlement has the name of James Dougherty Sr., a local Cherokee Indian.James was the son of Cornelius Dougherty and his Cherokee wife
