= Pat Daugherty =

Pat Daugherty may refer to:

- Patricia Daugherty, American management scientist
- Patrick M. Daugherty (1928–1997), American politician

== See also ==
- Pat Dougherty (born 1948), American politician
- Patrick Dougherty (disambiguation)
