= Richard E. Dougherty =

American civil engineer

- Born: Richard Erwin Dougherty; February 3, 1880; New York City, U.S.
- Died: September 9, 1961 (aged 81); White Plains, New York, U.S.
- Education: Columbia University
- Occupations: Civil engineer; Railroad executive
- Employer: New York Central System
- Title: President of the American Society of Civil Engineers (1948)

Richard Erwin Dougherty (February 3, 1880 – September 9, 1961) was an American civil engineer. He was vice president of New York Central System and played a role in White House Reconstruction. He was president of the American Society of Civil Engineers in 1948.

== Biography ==
Dougherty was born on February 3, 1880, in New York City. He graduated from Columbia University in 1901 with a degree in civil engineering.

Dougherty briefly taught engineering at Columbia before joining the New York Central System in 1902. He served in a number of subordinate positions before becoming assistant engineer in 1904, and resident engineer the following year. He later rose through the ranks as district engineer, design engineer, assistant to the vice president and president, while also advising the Port Authority of New York and New Jersey on port development. He became vice president of the railroad company in 1930. He worked on railroad as well as hydraulic projects. Among them were the rehabilitation of Manhattan's West Side to allow for the construction of war plants and later, the construction of West Side Highway.

Dougherty was director from 1928 to 1930, and became president of the American Society of Civil Engineers in 1948, the same year he retired from New York Central System. He remained a consultant to the company and oversaw the construction of the Grand Central Terminus real estate in 1951 and worked as a private consultant, advising companies such as the Long Island Rail Road.

Dougherty also served as a member of Harry S. Truman's Commission on the Renovation of the Executive Mansion.

Dougherty died in White Plains, New York, on September 9, 1961, at age 81.
