= Patrick Dougherty =

Patrick Dougherty may refer to:

- Patrick Dougherty (bishop) (1931–2010), Australian Roman Catholic bishop
- Patrick Dougherty (Medal of Honor) (1844–?), American Civil War sailor and Medal of Honor recipient
- Pat Dougherty (born 1948), American politician, Missouri state legislator
- Patsy Dougherty (1876–1940), American baseball player
- Charles Dougherty (baseball) (1879–1939), known as Pat, American baseball player in the pre-Negro leagues
- Patrick Dougherty (artist) (born 1945), American artist and sculptor who works with saplings and other natural materials
- Patrick Dougherty (American football) (born 1985), American football coach

== See also ==
- Pat Daugherty (disambiguation)
