= Docherty (novel) =

1975 novel by William McIlvanney

- First edition
- Author: William McIlvanney
- Publisher: Allen & Unwin
- Publication date: 6 February 1975
- Pages: 320
- ISBN: 9780048231185

Docherty is the third novel by William McIlvanney, first published in 1975.

== Plot ==
The book is set in a fictional mining town in Scotland in the early part of the 20th century, and it relates the struggles of a miner called Tam Docherty and his family. It opens with a prologue set in 1903 in which Tam's family and home are introduced and his wife Jenny gives birth to the youngest of her four children, Conn. Book One opens a few years later and provides a fuller introduction to the family. We learn that Tam is a lapsed Catholic while Jenny is a Protestant; we meet the eldest son Mick, the middle son Angus, the daughter Kathleen and her future husband Jack, as well as Jenny's father Mairtin and Tam's father, Old Conn, a devout Catholic. Tam has a hostile encounter with the Catholic priest Father Rankin. Kathleen marries Jack. Conn goes to school, where he is punished for fighting and using vernacular Scots. Conn knows of his father's respect for education, but "...against that went Conn's sense of the irrelevance of school, its denial of the worth of his father and his family[...]." This section of the novel ends with Conn entering puberty as he explores the countryside around Graithnock in the spring of 1914.

In Book Two the outbreak of war has a very direct impact on the Docherty family when Mick announces that he plans to join the army with his friend Danny Hawkins. This is against the wishes of Mick's girlfriend May as well as those of both Jenny and Tam, who cites Labour campaigner Keir Hardie's opinion that it is "a capitalist war". Mick ignores their protestations and enlists with Danny, who is later killed in action on the western front. Mick survives but is badly wounded and loses the sight of one eye and his right arm. Meanwhile, Conn scares his parents when he falls through the glass roof of the local mill. Kathleen has had a baby, Alec, and Tam tries unsuccessfully to impress on Conn the desirability of staying on at school instead of going down the mine, which is what Conn wants - although in fact Tam knows that the family cannot afford to do without Conn's earnings. At Christmas, Conn receives as presents from the rest of the family the clothing and equipment he will need as a miner: some time after this, Conn starts work at the pit alongside Angus and their father. Tam visits Mick in a military hospital and, on his return, with difficulty informs Jenny and the rest of the family of Mick's injuries. What has happened to Mick has a profound effect on Tam, who loses "the purpose of his own life" and starts drinking more heavily. Mick returns home and feels distant from his family; eventually he gets a job as a watchman at the mill. The war ends, and Mick shows no sign of elation but speaks cryptically of another, ongoing war. Book Two finishes with New Year 1920 being celebrated in the Docherty household with family and friends while Conn secretly has a sexual encounter with the much older Jessie Langley.

As Book Three opens, Angus accosts Jack as he leaves work and accuses him of violently abusing Kathleen. Jack tells him it is none of his business and Angus punches him. Later, Angus informs Tam that he plans to move to a different pit and operate a squad of miners on a contract to the mine-owners. Tam sees this as exploitation, but Mick asks why Angus shouldn't take the opportunity to make more money and a heated quarrel ensues between Tam and Mick. Angus and Conn have been visiting dance halls and one night a visitor comes to the Docherty home, the father of Sarah Davidson, a girl who Angus has made pregnant. Tam assures the man that Angus will marry his daughter but Angus shocks Tam by saying he does not intend to. Conn and Mick have to hold Tam back from battering Angus. Tam tells Angus he can marry the girl or move out. Angus decides to move out and moves into a local doss-house. There has been a lock-out at the mine for eleven weeks and the miners are now going back to work for the same wages as before. Angus's wedding takes place, but he is marrying Annie, not Sarah. Tam refuses to attend the wedding. One evening some time later Tam returns home drunk and is baited by Mick to the point where Tam violently turns the table over, shocking everyone. Shortly after this a rock-fall in the mine traps Tam under a heap of fallen rock and kills him. His lifeless body is brought to the surface by his comrades. Typically Tam saves the life of another of the miners while losing his own. Jenny is distraught. Knowing Tam's rejection of religion, Mick and Conn decide against a religious funeral service and Jenny agrees, despite the horror of Tam's Catholic relatives. Conn tells Angus he wants to fight him because of what Angus had done to their father; Angus reluctantly agrees and the pair meet early on a Sunday morning for an intense but inconclusive physical battle that leaves them both exhausted. Mick tells Conn he has joined the Communist Party and tells him no ruling class ever gave its power away; Conn says he has no desire to 'smash' people, he just wants them to see how good people like Tam were. In the last chapter, a group of Tam's friends reminisce about what a good man he was.

== Background ==
McIlvanney said the novel was "an attempt to democratise traditional culture, to give working-class life the vote in the literature of heroism."

== Awards ==
- 1975 Whitbread Award, for Best Novel
- 1975 Scottish Arts Council Book Award
