= Gordon Daugherty =

American computer scientist and author

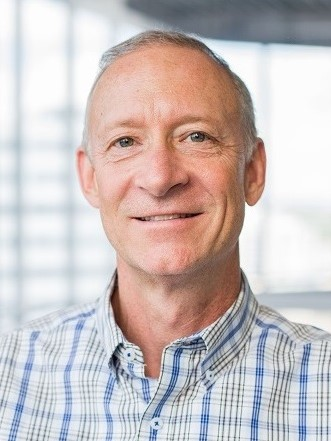
- Born: Dallas, Texas, United States
- Occupations: High-tech executive, business advisor, computer scientist and author

Academic background
- Education: Baylor University

Academic work
- Discipline: Computer science
- Main interests: IP videoconferencing

Gordon Daugherty is an American computer scientist, business advisor, high-tech executive and author. During his early career, he did research and development work on IP videoconferencing.

Daugherty co-founded Capital Factory, a co-working space, early stage venture fund and tech accelerator based in Austin, Texas. He also founded Shockwave Innovations, a content creation and advisory practice for the benefit of tech startups and entrepreneurs.

== Education and career ==
Daugherty was born in Dallas, Texas, and holds a bachelor's degree in computer science from Baylor University. He has worked at firms such as IBM and Compaq.

Daugherty worked at VCON Videoconferencing, which later became a publicly listed company in the Nouveau marché stock market in Paris (now a part of the Euronext Paris stock market) and was later acquired by an Israeli conglomerate named Emblaze. Additionally, Daugherty has worked at Austin-based NetQoS, which was acquired by CA Technologies, for $200million. Through his company Capital Factory and individually, Daugherty has invested in more than 250 early-stage companies.

Daugherty was an advisor for Riskpulse, which was sold to DHL and Columbia Capital in January 2020. He was also an advisor for as technology company MediaMind, which had an IPO in NASDAQ in 2010, and was acquired by Digital Generation Systems in 2011.

Daugherty co-founded Capital Factory, a co-working space and tech accelerator based in Austin, Texas. He also founded Shockwave Innovations, an advisory firm.

== Publications and lectures ==
Daugherty is the author of more than 150 articles and publications. He also frequently speaks at universities and trade shows such as SXSW.

In 2019, Daugherty wrote a book called Startup Success: Funding the Early Stages of Your Venture (ISBN 978-1632992451).

He is also a contributing writer at Texas CEO Magazine.

== Selected publications ==
- 2004: MXM: SIP Support Delivering SIP–H.323 Convergence and CoExistence Using a Video PBX Architecture White Paper created for VCON Visual Communications.
- 2003: The Business Case for Manages Rich Media Conferencing Services, White Paper created for VCON Visual Communications.
- 2003: Traversing Firewalls with Video over IP: Issues and Solutions, White Paper created for VCON Visual Communications.
- 2002: Interactive Multicast technology: Changing the Rules of Enterprise Streaming Video, White Paper created for VCON Visual Communications.

== Selected lectures, talks, and workshops ==
Daugherty's lectures, talks, and workshops include the following:

- 2020: Austin Forum: “From Tech Idea to Technology Impact: Creating Successful Tech Companies That Matter”
- 2020: Dallas Startup Week: “Funding the Early Stage of Your Venture”
- 2019: Pflugerville Business Pfirst Conference: "Defense Innovation: A Commanding Presence"
- 2019: Governor's Small Business forum (Central Texas)
- 2019: Austin Startup Week
- 2019: SXSW
- 2019: University of Texas
- 2018: Austin Forum: “Investing in Texas from Coasts: A Discussion with Non Texas VCs Writing Checks in Texas”
- 2018: Austin Startup Week
- 2017: Austin Forum: “Founders Academy Essentials; From Seed to Series A”
