= James Docherty (1950s footballer) =

Scottish footballer

Personal information
- Full name: James Docherty
- Place of birth: Scotland
- Position: Left half

Senior career*
Years	Team	Apps	(Gls)
1950–1952	Queen's Park	11	(0)
1952–1953	Airdrieonians	10	(0)

International career
1952	Scotland Amateurs	3	(0)
- * Club domestic league appearances and goals

James Docherty was a Scottish amateur footballer who played in the Scottish League for Queen's Park and Airdrieonians as a left half. He was capped by Scotland at amateur level.
