= James Docherty (1890s footballer) =

Scottish footballer

Personal information
- Full name: James Docherty
- Place of birth: Pollokshaws, Scotland
- Position: Wing half

Senior career*
Years	Team	Apps	(Gls)
1892–1893	Pollokshields		
1892–1895	Derby County	35	(0)
1897–1898	Luton Town	30	(0)
1898	Cowes		
Total		65	(0)
- * Club domestic league appearances and goals

James Docherty was a Scottish footballer who played in the Football League for Derby County and Luton Town.
