= Jamie Docherty =

Scottish footballer

Personal information
- Position: Forward

Senior career*
Years	Team	Apps	(Gls)
- Forfar Athletic
1909–1911	Dundee Hibernian	3	(0)
1911–1912	Partick Thistle		
1912	Dundee Hibernian	1	(0)
- * Club domestic league appearances and goals

Jamie Docherty was a Scottish professional footballer who played as a forward. He played for Forfar Athletic before joining newly formed Dundee Hibernian (now Dundee United) in June 1909. He was Dundee Hibernian's first scorer when he netted the equaliser in their first friendly match. Docherty spent two season at Tannadice and returned in December 1912 to play one further match after a spell at Partick Thistle. It is unknown where he went after leaving the club for a second time.
