= Jim Docherty =

Scottish footballer (born 1956)

Personal information
- Full name: James Docherty
- Date of birth: 8 November 1956 (age 69)
- Place of birth: Broxburn, Scotland
- Position: Striker

Senior career*
Years	Team	Apps	(Gls)
- Fauldhouse United
1977–1979	East Stirlingshire	47	(28)
1979	Chelsea	3	(0)
1979	Dundee United	2	(0)
1979–1981	Hearts	5	(0)
1981–1982	St Johnstone	49	(13)
1982–1984	Partick Thistle	10	(0)
1984	→ Meadowbank Thistle (loan)	3	(0)
1984	Dunfermline Athletic	2	(0)
- Whitburn
Total		121	(41)
- * Club domestic league appearances and goals

James Docherty (born 8 November 1956) is a Scottish former footballer who played as a striker.

== Career ==
Docherty began his short professional career with East Stirlingshire, where a prolific spell saw him sign for Chelsea in a club record £45,000 deal, which is still a club record transfer to this day. Just three games into his Chelsea career, Docherty left to join Dundee United on a free transfer in October 1979, but then subsequently left after playing only two matches. A further short time with Hearts preceded a spell with St Johnstone, where Docherty played just under fifty league matches. After leaving Perth, Docherty had short spells with Partick Thistle, Meadowbank Thistle (on loan) and Dunfermline Athletic. His professional career, which ended in his late twenties, lasted seven years.
