= Man-Monkey =

Man-Monkey may refer to:

- The Yeren
- Zip the Pinhead
