= Freak show =

Exhibition of physically unusual humans

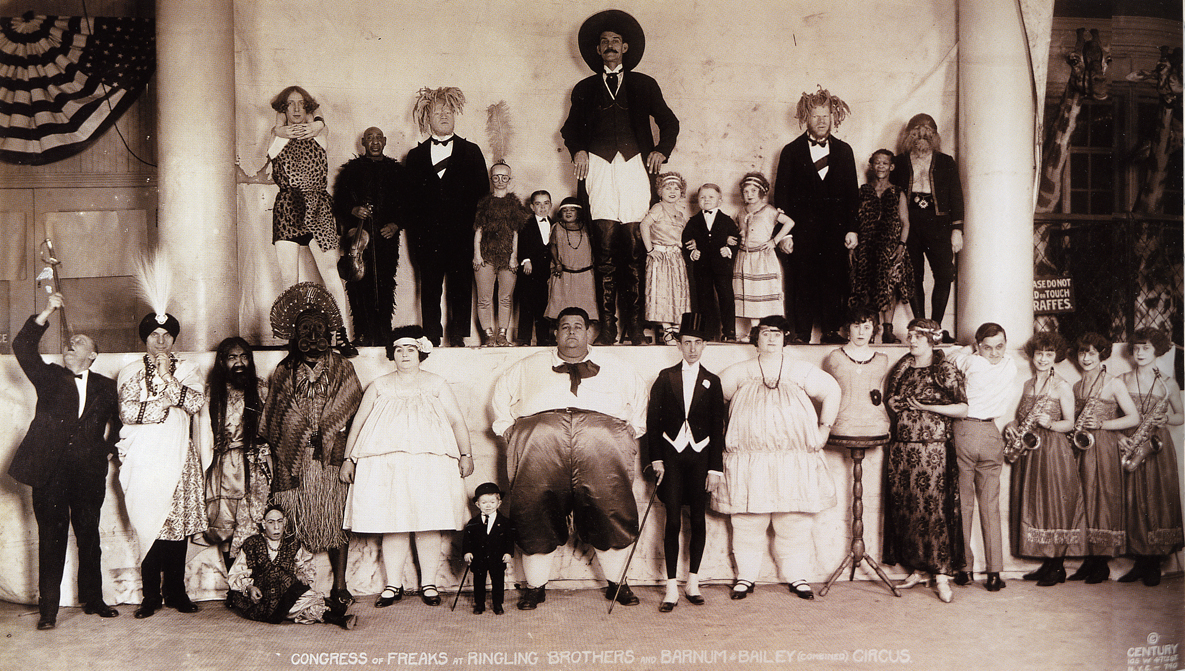
Congress of Freaks at Ringling Brothers, 1924

A freak show is an exhibition of biological rarities, referred to in popular culture as "freaks of nature". Typical features would be physically unusual humans, such as those uncommonly large or small, those with extraordinary diseases and conditions, and others with performances expected to be shocking to viewers. Heavily tattooed or pierced people have sometimes been seen in freak shows (more common in modern times as a sideshow act), as have attention-getting physical performers such as fire-eating and sword-swallowing acts.

== History ==
Since at latest the medieval period, people with deformities have often been treated as objects of interest and entertainment, and crowds have flocked to see them exhibited. A famous early modern example was the exhibition at the court of King Charles I of Lazarus and Joannes Baptista Colloredo, two conjoined brothers born in Genoa, Italy. While Lazarus appeared to be otherwise ordinary, the underdeveloped body of his brother dangled from his chest. When Lazarus was not exhibiting himself, he covered his brother with his cloak to avoid unnecessary attention.

As well as exhibitions, freak shows were popular in the taverns and fairgrounds, where the freaks were often combined with talent displays. For example, in the 18th century, Matthias Buchinger, born without arms or lower legs, entertained crowds with astonishing displays of magic and musical ability, both in England and later, Ireland.

It was in the 19th century, both in the United States and Europe, where freak shows finally reached maturity as successful commercially run enterprises.

A freak show in Rutland, Vermont, in 1941

During the late 19th and early 20th centuries, freak shows were at their height of popularity; the period 1840s through to the 1940s saw the organized for-profit exhibition of people with physical, mental, or behavioral rarities. Although not all abnormalities were real, some being alleged, the exploitation for profit was seen as an accepted part of American culture. The attractiveness of freak shows led to the spread of the shows that were commonly seen at amusement parks, circuses, dime museums and vaudeville. The early amusement park industry flourished in the United States by the expanding middle class who benefited from short work weeks and a larger income. There was also a shift in American culture that influenced people to see leisure activities as a necessary and beneficial equivalent to working, thus leading to the popularity of the freak show.

The showmen and promoters exhibited all types of freaks. People who appeared or were non-white or who had a disability were often exhibited as unknown races and cultures. These "unknown" races and disabled whites were advertised as being undiscovered humans to attract viewers. For example, those with microcephaly, a condition linked to intellectual disabilities and characterized by a very small, pointed head and small overall structure, were considered or characterized as "missing links" or as atavistic specimens of an extinct race. Hypopituitary dwarfs who tend to be well proportioned were advertised as lofty. Achondroplastic dwarfs, whose head and limbs tend to be out of proportion to their trunks, were characterized as exotic mode. Those who were missing some or all of their limbs were also characterized in the exotic mode as animal-people, such as "The Snake-Man", and "The Seal Man".

There were four ways freak shows were produced and marketed. The first was the oral spiel or lecture. This featured a showman or professor who managed the presentation of the people or "freaks". The second was a printed advertisement, usually using long pamphlets and broadside or newspaper advertisement of the freak show. The third step included costuming, choreography, performance, and space used to display the show, designed to emphasize the things that were considered abnormal about each performer. The final stage was a collectable drawing or photograph that portrayed the group of freaks on stage for viewers to take home. The collectable printed souvenirs were accompanied by recordings of the showman's pitch, the lecturer's yarn, and the professor's exaggerated accounts of what was witnessed at the show. Exhibits were authenticated by doctors who used medical terms that many could not comprehend at the time but which added an air of authenticity to the proceedings. Freak show culture normalized a specific way of thinking about gender, race, sexual aberrance, ethnicity, and disability. In the late 1920s and early 1930s, photographer Edward J. Kelty traveled with circus shows and took large group photos of the performers, including the "Congress of Freaks" portraits featuring acts the Ringling Brothers and Barnum & Bailey circus.

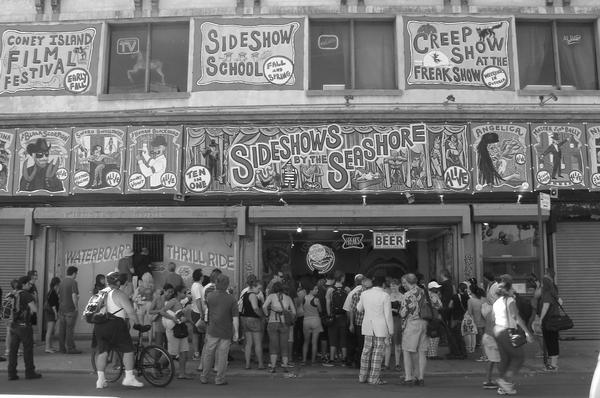
Coney Island and its popular ongoing freak show in August 2008

During the first decade of the 20th century, the popularity of the freak show was starting to dwindle. In their prime, freak shows had been the main attraction of the midway, but by 1940 they were starting to lose their audience, with credible people turning their backs on the show. The term ‘freak show’ has changed in connotation along with the change in attitudes as the public shifted from acceptance of performer exploitation to more concern and desire to understand them. Although the term can often be insulting when used to describe a person, ‘freak show’ is still used in the modern circus to name a show that has performances involving extreme body modification, endurance, and other physical acts. In the 19th century, science supported and legitimized the growth of freak shows, but by the 20th century, the medicalization of human abnormalities contributed to the end of the exhibits' mystery and appeal.

== P. T. Barnum ==
P. T. Barnum was considered the father of modern-day advertising, and one of the most famous showmen and managers of the freak show industry. In the United States he was a major figure in popularizing the entertainment. However, it was common for Barnum's acts to be schemes and not altogether true. Although he spent years collecting specimens, artifacts, and displays, his main passion was showmanship and entertainment rather than scientific education. Barnum was fully aware of the improper ethics behind his business as he said, "I don't believe in duping the public, but I believe in first attracting and then pleasing them." During the 1840s Barnum began his museum, which had a constantly rotating acts schedule, which included obese people, "living skeletons" (men who appear emaciated), little people, giants, and other people deemed to be freaks. The museum drew in about 400,000 visitors a year.

Barnum's American Museum was one of the most popular museums in New York City to exhibit freaks. In 1841 Barnum purchased The American Museum, which made freaks the major attraction, following mainstream America in the mid-19th century. Barnum was known to advertise aggressively and make up outlandish stories about his exhibits. The façade of the museum was decorated with bright banners showcasing his attractions and included a band that performed outside. Barnum's American Museum also offered multiple attractions that not only entertained but tried to educate and uplift its working-class visitors. Barnum offered one ticket that guaranteed admission to his lectures, theatrical performances, a menagerie, and a glimpse at curiosities both living and dead.

One of Barnum's exhibits centered on Charles Sherwood Stratton, the dwarf billed as "General Tom Thumb" who was then 4 years of age but was stated to be 11. Charles had stopped growing after the first 6 months of his life, at which point he was 25 inches (64 cm) tall and weighed 15 pounds (6.8 kg). With heavy coaching and natural talent, the boy was taught to imitate people from Hercules to Napoleon. By 5, he was drinking wine, and by 7 smoking cigars for the public's amusement. During 1844–45, Barnum toured with Tom Thumb in Europe and met Queen Victoria, who was amused and saddened by the little man, and the event was a publicity coup. Barnum paid Stratton about $150.00 a week. When Stratton retired, he lived in the most esteemed neighborhood of New York, owned a yacht, and dressed in the nicest clothing he could buy.

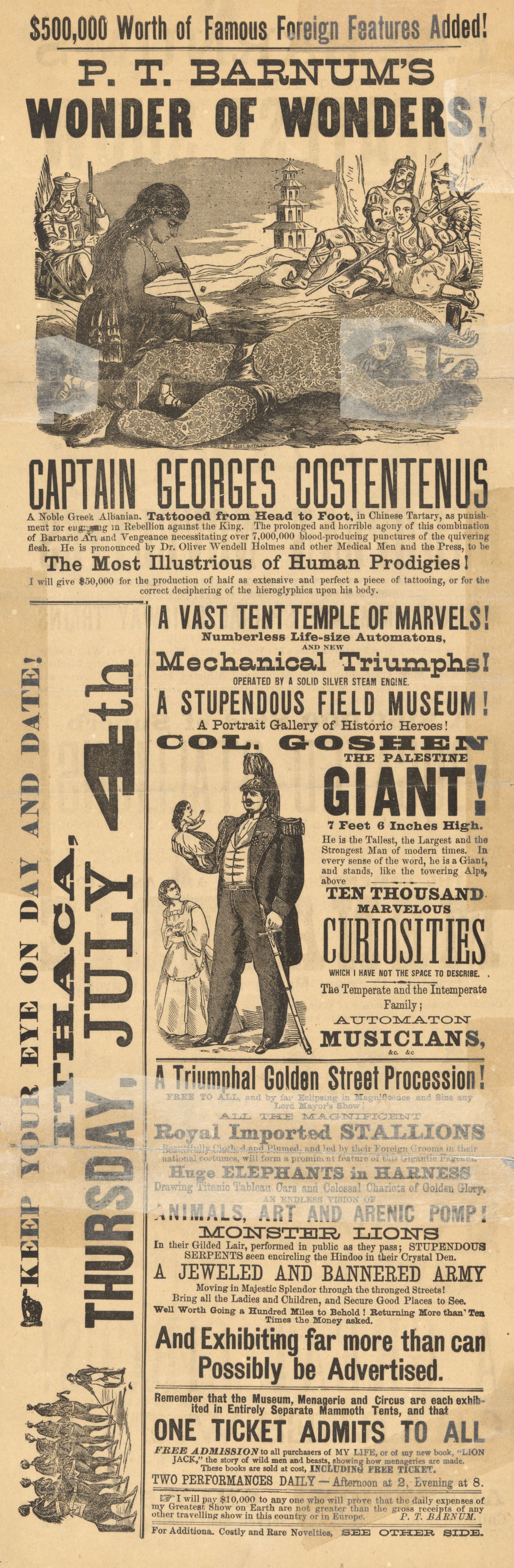
P.T. Barnum's Own and Only Greatest Show on Earth appearing in Ithaca, New York on July 4, 1878

In 1860, The American Museum had listed and archived thirteen human curiosities in the museum, including an albino family, The Living Aztecs, three dwarfs, a Black mother with two albino children, The Swiss Bearded Lady, and William Henry Johnson, an intellectually disabled Black man. Barnum introduced the "man-monkey" William Henry Johnson, a microcephalic Black dwarf who spoke a mysterious language created by Barnum and was known as Zip the Pinhead. In 1862, he discovered the giantess Anna Swan and Commodore Nutt, a new Tom Thumb, with whom Barnum visited President Abraham Lincoln at the White House. During the Civil War, Barnum's museum drew large audiences seeking diversion from the conflict.

Barnum's most popular and highest grossing act was the Tattooed Man, George Costentenus. He claimed to be a Greek-Albanian prince raised in a Turkish harem. He had 338 tattoos covering his body. Each one was ornate and told a story. His story was that he was on a military expedition but was captured by native people, who gave him the choice of either being chopped up into little pieces or receive full body tattoos. This process supposedly took three months and Costentenus was the only hostage who survived. He produced a 23-page book, which detailed every aspect of his experience and drew a large crowd. When Costentenus partnered with Barnum, he began to earn more than $1,000 a week. His wealth became so staggering that the New York Times wrote, "He wears very handsome diamond rings and other jewelry, valued altogether at about $3,000 [$94,699 in 2024 dollars] and usually goes armed to protect himself from persons who might attempt to rob him." Though Costentenus was fortunate, other freaks were not. Upon his death in 1891, he donated about half of his life earnings to other freaks who did not make as much money as he did.

One of Barnum's most famous hoaxes was early in his career. He hired a blind and paralyzed former slave named Joice Heth for $1,000. He claimed that this woman was 161 years old, but she was actually only 80. This lie helped Barnum make a weekly profit of nearly $1,000. This hoax was one of the first, but one of the more convincing.

Barnum retired in 1865 when his museum burnt to the ground. Though Barnum was and still is criticized for exploitation, he paid the performers fairly handsome sums of money. Some of the acts made the equivalent of what some sports stars make today.

== Tom Norman ==
Barnum's English counterpart was Tom Norman, a renowned Victorian showman, whose traveling exhibitions featured Eliza Jenkins, the "Skeleton Woman", a "Balloon Headed Baby" and a woman who bit off the heads of live rats—the "most gruesome" act Norman claimed to have seen. Other acts included fleas, fat ladies, giants, dwarfs and retired white seamen, painted black and speaking in an invented language, billed "savage Zulus". He displayed a "family of midgets" which in reality was composed of two men and a borrowed baby. He operated a number of shops in London and Nottingham, and exhibited travelling shows throughout the country.

Most famously, in 1884, Norman came into contact with Joseph Merrick, sometimes called "the Elephant Man", a young man from Leicester with extreme deformities. Merrick arrived in London and into Norman's care. Norman, initially shocked by Merrick's appearance and reluctant to display him, nonetheless exhibited him at his penny gaff shop at 123 Whitechapel Road, directly across the road from the London Hospital. Because of its proximity to the hospital, the shop received medical students and doctors as visitors. One of these was a young surgeon named Frederick Treves, who arranged to have Merrick brought to the hospital to be examined. The exhibition of the Elephant Man was reasonably successful, particularly with the added income from a printed pamphlet about Merrick's life and condition.

At this time, however, public opinion about freak shows was starting to change and the display of human novelties was beginning to be viewed as distasteful. After only a few weeks with Norman, the Elephant Man exhibition was shut down by the police, and Norman and Merrick parted ways. Treves later arranged for Merrick to live at the London Hospital until his death in 1890. In Treves's 1923 memoir, The Elephant Man and Other Reminiscences made Norman infamous as a drunk who cruelly exploited Merrick. Norman rebutted these claims in a letter in the World's Fair newspaper that year, as well as his own autobiography. Norman's opinion was that he provided Merrick (and his other exhibits) a way of making a living and remaining independent, but that on entering the London Hospital, Merrick remained a freak on display, only with no control over how or when he was viewed.

== Dime Museum ==
A different way to display a freak show was in a dime museum. In a dime museum, freak show performers were exhibited as an educational display of people with different disabilities. For a cheap admission viewers were awed with its dioramas, panoramas, georamas, cosmoramas, paintings, relics, freaks, stuffed animals, menageries, waxworks, and theatrical performances. No other type of entertainment appealed to such diverse audiences before. In the 1870s, dimes grew and grew, peaking in the 1880s and 1890s, available for all from coast to coast. With more dime museums than any place in the world, New York City was the dime museum capital, with an entertainment district that included German beer gardens, theaters, vendors, photography, studios, and a variety of other amusement institutions. To attract an audience, marketing was an essential tool necessary for museum survival. Banners, posters, and billboards promoted attractions while brochures were created for people to take home and share. Souvenirs were also tactics used to draw crowds in.

Freak shows were the main attraction of most dime museums during 1870–1900, with the human oddity as the king of museum entertainment. There were four types of human abnormalities on display in dime museums: natural freaks, those born with physical or mental abnormalities, such as dwarfs and "pinheads"; self-made freaks who cultivated freakdom, for example tattooed people; novelty artists who were considered freaks for their "freakish" performances, such as snake charmers, mesmerists, hypnotists, and fire-eaters; non-Western freaks who were promoted as exotic curiosities, for example savages and cannibals, usually promoted as being from Africa. Although some of the performers were taken advantage of, making the choice to perform for the crowds gave agency to a group that might not have otherwise had a lot of choice in employment. Not only that, but many of them also enjoyed performing, and continued to do so even after they no longer needed to. Most dime museums had no seats in the curio halls. Visitors were directed from platform to platform by a lecturer, whose role was to be the master of ceremonies. During his performance, the lecturer, also known as the "Professor", held the audience's attention by describing the freaks displayed on the various stages. The lecturer needed to have both charisma and persuasiveness in addition to a loud voice. His rhetorical style usually was styled after the traditional distorted spiel of carnival barkers, filled with classical and biblical suggestions. Dime museum freak shows also provided audiences with medical testimonials provided by "doctors", psychologists and other behavioral "experts" who were there to help the audience understand a particular problem and to validate a show's subject.

At the end of the 19th century, there was a shift in popularity of the dime museum and it began its downward turn. Audiences could now choose from a wide variety of popular entertainments. Circuses, street fairs, world's fairs, carnivals, and urban amusement parks, all of which exhibited freaks, began to take business away from the dime museums.

== Circus ==
In the circus world, freak shows, also called sideshows, were an essential part of the circus. The largest sideshow was attached to the most prestigious circus, Ringling Brothers, Barnum and Bailey, known as the "big one". It was a symbol of the peak of the practice and its acceptance in American society. In the early 1800s, single human oddities started joining traveling circuses, but these shows were not organized into anything like typical sideshows until the midcentury. During the 1870s it was common to see freak shows at most circuses, eventually making the circus a hub for the display of human oddities.

Most of the museums and sideshows that had traveled with major circuses were owned during most of 1876. By 1880 human phenomena were now combined with a variety of entertainment acts from the sideshows. By 1890 tent size and the number of sideshow attractions began to increase, with most sideshows in large circuses with twelve to fifteen exhibits plus a band. Bands typically were made up of Black musicians, blackface minstrel bands, and troupes of dancers dressed as Hawaiians. These entertainers were used to attract crowds and provide a festive atmosphere inside the show tent.

Because the circus traveled from city to city, it became a self-contained community where performers and workers lived and worked together. Thousands of workers took part in the daily assembly and disassembly of the entire operation as the show moved from town to town.

By the 1920s, the circus was declining as a major form of amusement due to competition from amusement parks, movie houses and burlesque tours, and the rise of the radio. Circuses also saw a large decline in audience during the Depression, as economic hard times and union demands made the circus less and less affordable and valuable.

== Disability ==
Freak shows were viewed as a normal part of American culture in the late 19th to the early 20th centuries. The shows were viewed as a suitable amusement for the middle class and were profitable for the showmen, who exploited freak show performers' disabilities for profit.

Ugly laws in the United States, starting in the 1860s, banned those who were "diseased, maimed, mutilated, or in any way deformed" from public view—making it hard for such people to support themselves. Exhibitions, however, were specifically excepted. Although freak shows were viewed as a place for entertainment, they were also a place of employment for those who could advertise, manage, and perform in the attractions. In an era before social safety nets or worker's compensation, severely disabled people often found that exhibiting themselves was their only opportunity to make a living. In the 19th century performing in an organized freak show was perceived as a "viable" way to earn a living, as opposed to begging. Many freak show performers were lucky and gifted enough to earn a livelihood and have a good life through exhibitions, some becoming celebrities, commanding high salaries and earning far more than acrobats, novelty performers, and actors. The salaries of dime museum freaks usually varied from 25 to 500 dollars a week, making more money than lecture-room variety performers. Freaks were seen to have profitable traits, with an opportunity to become celebrities obtaining fame and fortune. At the height of freak shows' popularity, they were one of the few jobs for dwarfs.

Many scholars have argued that freak show performers were exploited by the showmen and managers for profit because of their disabilities. Many freaks were paid generously, but had to deal with museum managers who were often insensitive about the performers' schedules, working them long hours just to make a profit. This was particularly hard for top performers, since more frequent shows sold more tickets. Many entertainers were abused by small-time museum operators, kept to grueling schedules, and given only a small percentage of their total earnings. Individual exhibits were hired for about one to six weeks by dime museums. The average performer had a schedule that included 10 to 15 shows a day, and was shuttled back and forth week after week from one museum to another. When a popular freak show performer came to a dime museum in New York, they were overworked and exploited to make the museum money. For example, when Fedor Jeftichew (known as "Jo-Jo, the Dog-Faced Boy") appeared at the Globe Museum in New York, his manager arranged to have him perform 23 shows during a 12- to 14-hour day.

The decline of the freak show's popularity started towards the beginning of the 20th century as attitudes about physical differences started to change. Freaks became more sympathetic and less feared as previous anomalies were stripped of their mystery after being scientifically explained as genetic mutations or diseases. Laws were passed restricting freak shows in response to these new views. Michigan, for example, passed laws forbidding the "exhibition [of] any deformed human being or human monstrosity, except as used for scientific purposes". Movies and television began to fill that void around the start of the 20th century. People could see similar types of acts and abnormalities from the comfort of their own homes or a theater, and no longer needed to pay to see freaks. An even bigger impact for the decline was the rise of disability rights. Many now viewed freak shows as wrong and profiting from others' misfortune. Though paid well, the freaks of the 19th century did not always enjoy quality of life. Frank Lentini, the three-legged man, was quoted saying, "My limb does not bother me as much as the curious, critical gaze."

== Historical timeline ==
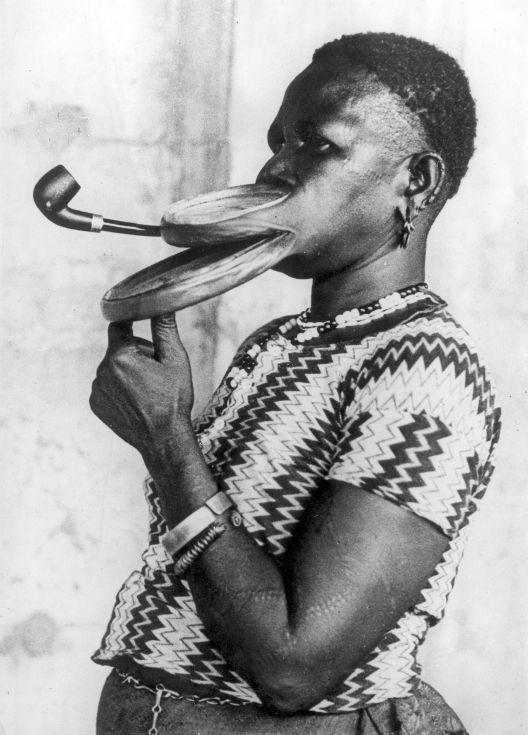
Madam Gustika of the "Duckbill tribe" smoking a pipe with an extended mouthpiece for her lips during a show in a New York circus in 1930. Her lips were stretched by the insertion of disks of incrementally increasing size.

The exhibition of human oddities has a long history:

1630s
Lazarus Colloredo, and his conjoined twin brother, Joannes Baptista, who was attached at Lazarus' sternum, toured Europe.

1704–1718
Peter the Great collected many types of oddities and founded his cabinet of curiosities called Kunstkammer in what is now St. Petersburg, Russia. He collected the specimens to help educate the people of Russia because he felt that it was the mark of a great civilization. His collection grew to include both animal and human examples such as an eight-legged deer and a three-legged baby.

1738
The exhibition of a creature who "was taken in a wook at Guinea; 'tis a female about four feet high in every part like a woman excepting her head which nearly resembles the ape."

1810–1815
Sarah Baartman (aka "Hottentot Venus"), a Khoekhoe woman, was exhibited in Europe.

1829–1870
The original "Siamese twins", Chang and Eng Bunker were conjoined twin brothers who started performing in 1829. They stopped performing in 1870 due to Chang having a stroke.

1842–1883
In 1842 Charles Sherwood Stratton was presented on the freak show platform as "General Tom Thumb". Charles had hypopituitary dwarfism; he stopped performing in 1883 due to a stroke that led to his death.

1849–1867
In 1849 Maximo and Bartola started performing in freak shows as "The Last of the Ancient Aztecs of Mexico". Both performers had microcephaly and stopped performing in 1867 after they were married to each other.

1860–1905
Hiram and Barney Davis were presented as the "wild men" from Borneo. Both brothers were intellectually disabled. They stopped performing in 1905 after Hiram's death.

1884
Joseph Merrick was exhibited as "The Elephant Man" by Tom Norman in London's East End.

1912–1935
Daisy and Violet Hilton were conjoined twin sisters who started performing at the age of four in 1912. They grew in popularity during the 1920s to the 1930s performing dance routines and playing instruments. They stopped performing in 1935 due to financial troubles.

1932
Tod Browning's Pre-Code-era film Freaks tells the story of a traveling freakshow. The use of real sideshow performers with genuine deformities in the film provoked public outcries, but the film underwent critical reappraisal in the following decades and screened at the 1962 Cannes Film Festival. Two stars of the film were Daisy and Violet Hilton: conjoined sisters who had been raised being exhibited in freak shows.

1960
Albert-Alberta Karas was an Intersex person exhibited with Bobby Reynolds on sideshow tour.

1991
Jim Rose Circus toured with the Lollapalooza Festival in 1992 and was described as "a triumphant comeback of the freak show" by the LA Times.

1992
Grady Stiles ("Lobster Boy") was shot in his home in Gibsonton, Florida.

1996
Chicago shock-jock Mancow Muller presented Mancow's Freak Show at the United Center in the middle of 1996, to a crowd of 30,000. The show included Kathy Stiles and her brother Grady III as the Lobster Twins.

2000–2010
The Bros. Grim Sideshow first opened its tent at Milwaukee's Great Circus Parade showgrounds in 2000. The owner Ken Harck described the production as the closest "authentic" show modeled on early 20th century sideshows. The troup later toured with Ozzfest for multiple dates, including the years 2006 and 2007. Some of the performers included The Enigma and his wife Katzen, Jesus "Chuy" Aceves (also known as Chuy the wolfman), Stalking Cat, and Slymenstra Hymen formerly of Gwar.

2005
999 Eyes Freakshow is founded, touting itself as the "last genuine traveling freakshow in the United States." 999 Eyes portrays freaks in a positive light, insisting that "what is different is beautiful." Freaks include Black Scorpion.

2007
Wayne Schoenfeld brought together several sideshow performers to The L.A. Circus Congress of Freaks and Exotics, to photograph sideshow folks for Cirque Du Soleil – Circus of the Sun. In attendance were Bill Quinn, the halfman; Percilla, the fat lady; Mighty Mike Murga the Mighty Dwarf; Dieguito El Negrito, a wildman; Christopher Landry; fire-eaters; sword swallowers, and more.

== Modern freak shows ==
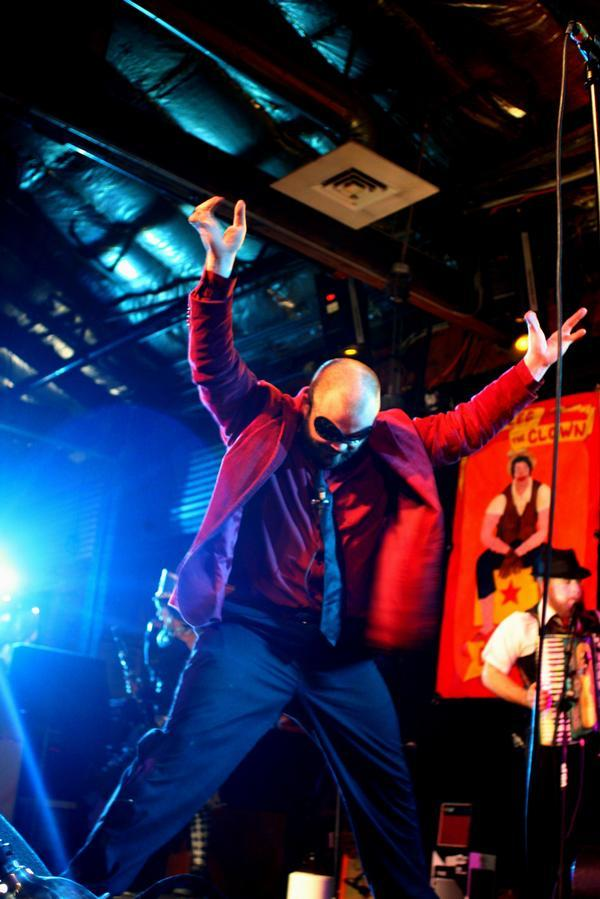
The Black Scorpion performing in 2007

The entertainment appeal of the traditional "freak shows" is arguably echoed in numerous programmes made for television. Extraordinary People on the British television channel Five and BodyShock show the lives of severely disabled or deformed people, and can be seen as the modern equivalent of circus freak shows. To cater to current cultural expectations of disability narratives, the subjects are usually portrayed as heroic and attention is given to their family and friends and the way they help them overcome their disabilities. In The Guardian, Chris Shaw, however, comments that "one man's freak show is another man's portrayal of heroic triumph over medical adversity" and carries on with "call me prejudiced but I suspect your typical twentysomething watched this show with their jaw on the floor rather than a tear in their eye".

== In popular culture ==
Freak shows are a common subject in Southern Gothic literature, including stories such as Flannery O'Connor's Temple of the Holy Ghost, Eudora Welty's Petrified Man and Keela the Outcast Indian Maiden, Truman Capote's Tree of Night, and Carson McCullers's The Heart Is a Lonely Hunter.

The musical Side Show centers around Daisy and Violet Hilton and their lives as conjoined twins on exhibition.

The 1932 pre-Code film Freaks follows the lives of freak show performers as they struggle against two callous trapeze artists.

The 1980 film Carny features a freak show ran within a traveling carnival, starring people who actually worked in freak shows, such as Percilla Bejano as "Monkey Girl" and Jóhann Pétursson as "Giant".

American Horror Story: Freak Show also focuses on freak shows. Some of its characters are played by disabled people, rather than all of the disabilities being created through makeup or effects. However, an article in The Guardian criticized the show, saying it perpetuated the term "freak" and the negative view of disability associated with it.

== See also ==
- Human zoo
- Comprachicos
- Geek show
- Freak show fight
- Claude-Ambroise Seurat
- Shoot the Freak
