= Octoman =

Octoman may refer to:

- Rudy Santos, a man from Philippines who bears an extra leg and four arms
- Dudley Octoman, a South Australian politician
- Octoman, a character in the video game F-Zero

== See also ==
- Octaman, a 1971 monster film written and directed by Harry Essex
