= Autosite =

Autosite can mean:

- the independent twin of a pair of conjoined twins where the other twin is a parasitic twin
- a website about cars
