= Wild Men of Borneo =

Sibling circus duo

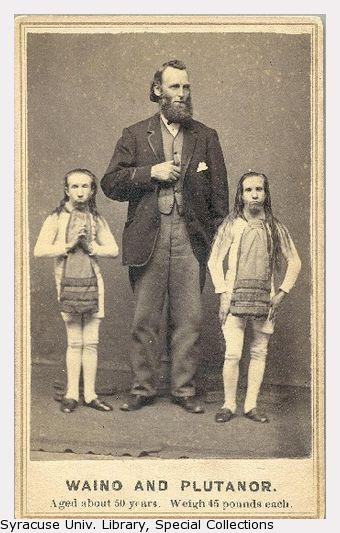

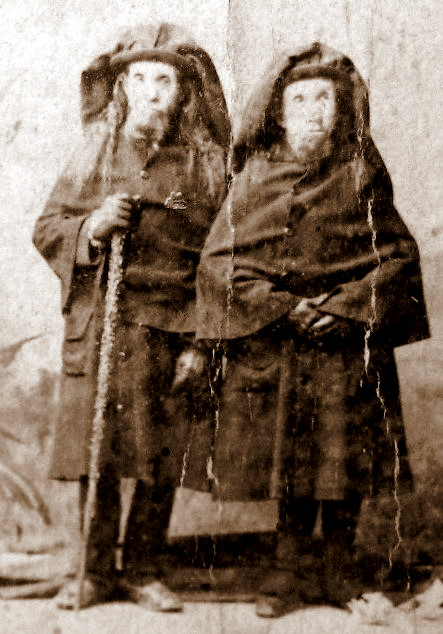
Waino and Plutanor circa 1870s

The Wild Men of Borneo, Waino and Plutanor, were a pair of dwarf brothers who were most famously associated with P. T. Barnum and his freak show exhibitions.

== Early life and family ==
Waino and Plutanor were actually Hiram W. and Barney Davis, two intellectually disabled brothers from a Pleasant Township, Knox County, Ohio farm, born in 1825 in England and 1827 in Ohio respectively. The 1850 census for them suggests they were born slightly later in 1829 and 1831. Their parents were David Harrison Davis and Catherine Blydenburgh. After their father's death in 1842, their mother remarried to William Porter.

== Career ==
As adults, they were each 3 feet 6 inches (1.07 m) tall and weighed about 45 pounds (20 kg), yet could perform feats of great strength, such as lifting heavy weights and wrestling with audience members on stage. Discovered and promoted by a traveling showman known as Doctor Warner in 1852, Hiram and Barney were given new names, Waino and Plutanor, and a sensational backstory – they were said to be from the island of Borneo, where they had been captured after a great struggle with armed sailors. They initially had modest success, but at least one newspaper believed them to be dwarves from the US. The two were exhibited at state fairs across the US. In the 1860 census they were living in Somerville, Massachusetts, in the household of Henry Harvey, a showman. At some point in the next few years management of the pair was transferred to a relative of Doctor Warner, Hanford A. Warner.

In 1874, they were valued at $50,000. In January 1877 they were performing at the New American Museum located in Manhattan. In June 1880 at the time of the federal census, they were touring with William C. Coup's circus and were enumerated under their assumed identities. By 1882 Waino and Plutanor became involved with P. T. Barnum and his traveling exhibitions. With Barnum's fabled promotional skill, the careers of the Wild Men of Borneo took off and over the course of the next 25 years, the pair earned approximately $200,000, which was an enormous sum in that era, equivalent to over $6,800,000 today.

Their exhibitions primarily consisted of performing acts of great strength, such as lifting adult audience members and wrestling with both audience members and each other. They were said to be able to lift up to 300 pounds (140 kg) each. In November 1887 they were performing at Eugene Robinson's Dime Museum and Theatre. In the 1890s, Hanford's son Ernest took over the management duties of the Davis brothers due to the elder Hanford becoming blind.

== Retirement and demise ==
In 1903 the brothers were withdrawn from exhibitions by the Warner family.

Hiram died in Waltham, Massachusetts on March 16, 1905. Barney stopped working after his brother's death. Their former manager Hanford Warner died in 1910.

Barney died on May 31, 1912, at Waltham, Massachusetts at the Warner family home.

The two are buried together in Mount Vernon, Ohio, under a gravestone marked "Little Men." Newspapers from the time report them being buried in Waltham, Massachusetts. It is unknown when their bodies were moved to Ohio.
