= Lazarus and Joannes Baptista Colloredo =

17th-century Italian conjoined twins

Lazarus Colloredo and Joannes Baptista Colloredo
- Lazzaro Colloredo e Joannes Baptista Colloredo
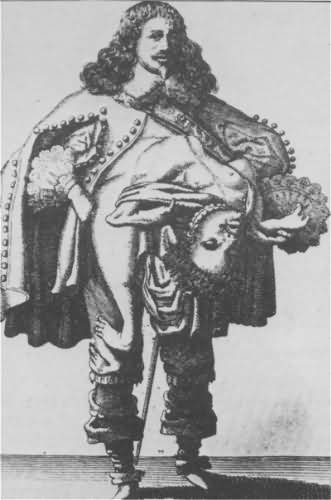
- Lazarus and his brother Joannes Baptista in a contemporary etching before 1700
- Born: March 12, 1617; Genoa, Italy
- Died: after 1646
- Occupation: entertainer
- Years active: 1642-1646
- Known for: being conjoined twins

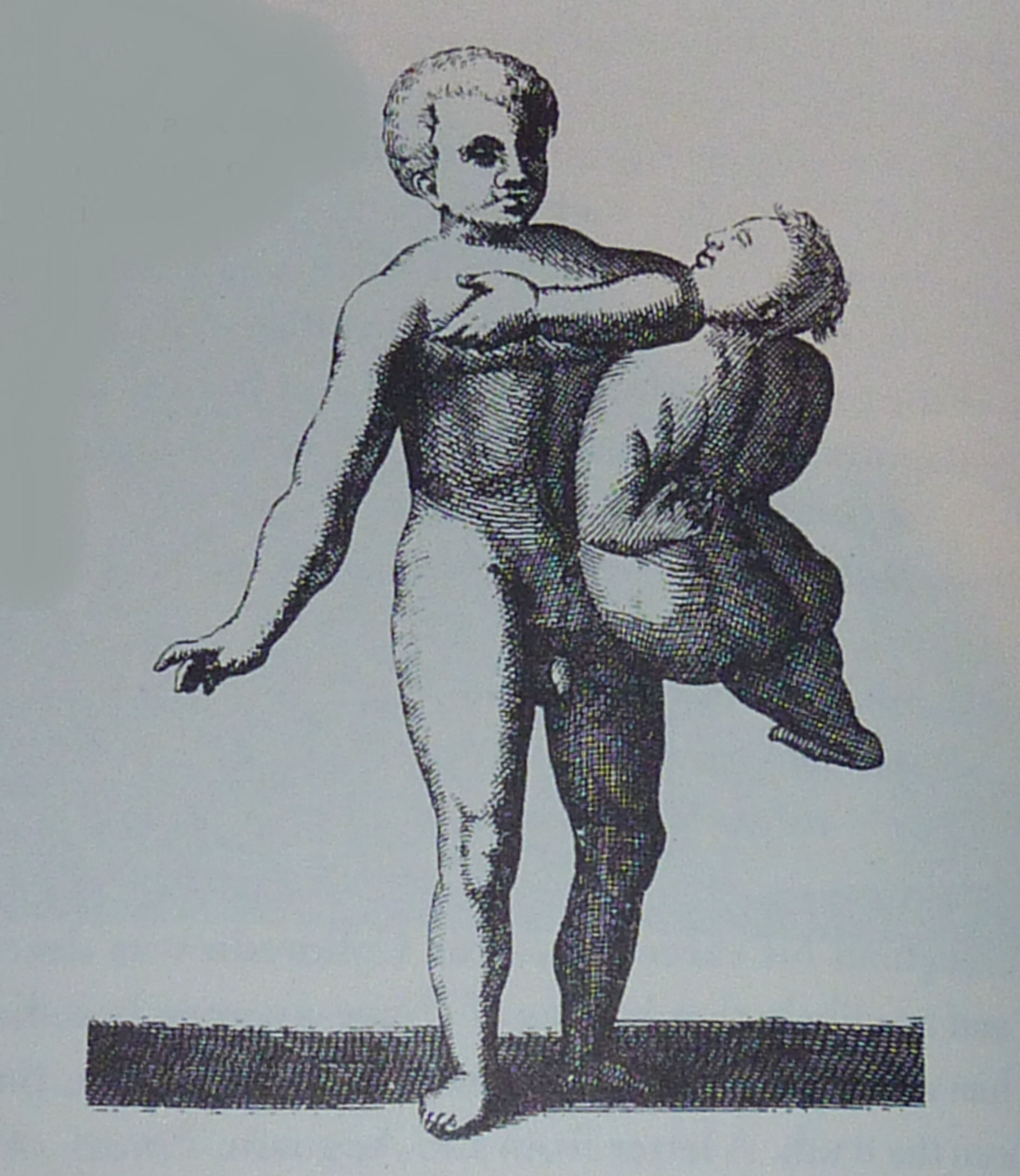
Lazarus and his brother Joannes Baptista in a contemporary etching.

Lazarus Colloredo and Joannes Baptista Colloredo (1617 – after 1646) were Italian conjoined twins who toured freak shows in 17th-century Europe. They were born on March 19,1617 in Genoa, Italy. The brothers' exact date or dates of death are unknown. They are last mentioned in life c. 1646.

== Physical condition ==
The upper body and left leg of Joannes Baptista (named after John the Baptist) stuck out of his mobile brother, Lazarus. He did not speak, kept his eyes closed and mouth open all the time, and was a parasitic twin. Joannes did not eat, instead being fed through Lazarus, similar with urination. John Spadling described Joannes' appearance as closed eyes, two arms, three fingers on each hand, one leg with a 6 toed foot, a beard, and had the same hair color of Lazarus.

Lazarus showed good physical health for most of his lives, but Joannes had swelling in his head, edema, and sores. Physicians believed it was from his positioning of the body. If one of the brothers was sick, the physicians feared treating one would harm the other.

According to a later account by Copenhagen anatomist Thomas Bartholinus, if someone pushed the breast of Joannes Baptista, he moved his hands, ears, or lips. Lazarus seemed to be so used to his brother's weight that the burden didn't bother him even when he played handball, as told by Henri Sauval.

== Entertainment career ==
To make a living, Lazarus toured around Europe and visited at least France, Switzerland, and Denmark, and later visited the court of Charles I of England.John Spadling wrote about seeing them in a travelling show, who he says was 24 years old, wealthy enough to have two servants help him in travels, and had crowds come to see him. He also visited Danzig (Gdańsk), the Ottoman Empire, and toured Germany and Italy before 1646.

== Personal life ==
Contemporary accounts described Lazarus as courteous and handsome, but not for his brother who just dangled before him. When Lazarus was not exhibiting himself, he covered his brother with his cloak to avoid unnecessary attention. His engraved portrait depicts him in a costume of a courtier of the period.

== Death sentence ==
Henri Sauval was told by Lazarus in 1638 that at a public house, Lazarus was bullied by a man and he stabbed that man which killed him. Lazarus was sentenced to death but begged the court not to as if he were killed, Joannes would be as well. He countered Joannes was innocent and so the court would be murderers as well.
