= Built by Snow =

US musical group

Built By Snow
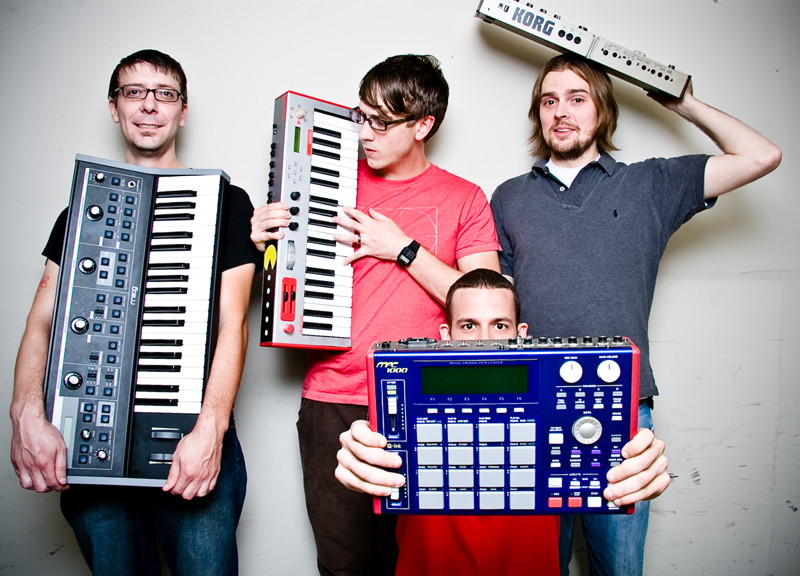

Background information
- Origin: Austin, Texas, United States
- Genres: Rock; pop; power pop; chiptune
- Years active: 2006–present
- Labels: Self-released
- Members: JP Pfertner; Matt Murray; Ben Bauer; Brandon Stein
- Past members: Jason Black; Black Scorpion
- Website: www.builtbysnow.com

Built By Snow is an American four-piece rock band based in Austin, Texas formed in 2006. To date, the band has released one EP, and one mini-full-length album. The band has described themselves as "Catchy keyboard indie pop rock with an explosion of velcro melodies and magnetic hooks that hit your brain like an Atari blasting out of a bazooka."

== History ==
The band met while working together in the production department at a television station in Austin. After winning a Battle of the Bands competition, they used the prize money to record their first EP, "NOISE." Recorded during the summer months of 2007 at Music Lab Recording Studio in Austin, Texas, "NOISE" is 7 powerpop songs about girls, teenage hope, dorks, NASA engineers, and robots.

During the summer months of 2008, Built By Snow began working on their second album, "MEGA." Recorded at The Bubble in Austin, Texas, "MEGA" is described as 9 songs of catchy keyboard rock with velcro melodies that will stick to your brain and won't let go. Following the release of "MEGA," Built By Snow performed a showcase in the 2009 (SXSW) South By Southwest Music Festival in Austin, Texas, and at the 2009 (NXNE) North By North East Music Festival in Toronto.

== Musical style ==
Built By Snow is a catchy rock/pop song built around a wave of Moog synthesizers, circuit-bending Casio Keyboards, and overdriven guitars. Reviewers have compared their sound to the Cars, early Weezer and DEVO.

== Music videos ==
The first video released by the band was for the track "Drag Away" from the EP NOISE. The video, directed by Andy Garibay, is set inside a station floating in deep space and follows a similar plot to 2001: A Space Odyssey. The spaceship's on-board computer takes over and turns members JP and Matt into zombie robots, who fight Ben for control of the station. This video won 3rd place in the Project Breakout online video contest.

In February 2008 the band released an animated music video for the track "Underneath' from the EP NOISE. The video, Directed by Andy Garibay, was designed by Built By Snow guitarist Matt Murray who created a virtual 8-bit Nintendo video game world as the setting. The band, acting as space pilots, was recorded in front of a green screen then superimposed into the video game setting. Band members, JP, Matt, and Ben were the space pilot heroes in the video, while drummer Brandon played the bad guy. The evil robots were all Brandon clones, and the flying Medusa head at the end of the video was also Brandon.

== Discography ==
=== Albums ===
- MEGA (2009) self-released

=== EPs ===
- NOISE (2007) self-released

== Side Projects ==
Built By Snow singer and songwriter JP also releases music under the names Velcrowolf, Oh Look Out, and No Cares. These side projects contain songs written and recorded by JP at home.

In 2010, Built By Snow guitarist Matt began playing with the Austin Texas band 'Red Falcon'.
