= Oh Look Out =

- Origin: Austin, Texas, United States
- Genres: Rock; lo-fi; indie
- Years active: 2011–present
- Members: JP Pfertner
- Website: www.ohlookout.com

Oh Look Out is a creative/music project based in Austin, Texas, led by singer–songwriter JP Pfertner. To date, Oh Look Out has released five albums, and is described as "Catchy indie rock/pop with waves of fuzzy guitars and Casio keyboards that hit your brain like an Atari blasting out of a jambox bazooka."

== History ==
In 2011, following five years of writing and performing with the band Built By Snow lead singer and songwriter JP Pfertner started releasing home audio recordings, videos, and designs under the name "Oh Look Out." The first release in fall 2011, "Alright Alright Alright Alright Alright" is a collection of songs selected from recordings made in his bedroom/makeshift studio. The result was a mix of energetic indie rock/pop songs, drawing on inspiration from The Cars, The Rentals, and DEVO, as well as melancholy keyboard pop songs that draw comparisons to the bedroom recording legend, Daniel Johnston.

The day after "Alright Alright Alright Alright Alright" was released, JP pulled out some small amps and guitars, an old drum kit, a cassette tape recorder, a battery powered Casiotone keyboard, and began recording a new album in his garage. These recordings became the second Oh Look Out album, titled "Orchestrated Fuzz." Released in Fall 2012, Orchestrated Fuzz is nine songs that all connect together with waves of crunchy guitars, punchy keys, big drums and lyrics about losing your mind, exploding, reliving better years, and wearing out everything that you love. Songs spin backwards, Mellotrons play alongside moogs, cassette tape samples blast through jambox speakers, and songs smash into one another keeping the album moving with no gaps from start to end.

== Discography ==
- Messy Hair and Bombs of Heck (2022) self-released
- Walkman Wars (2020) self-released
- No Cares (2018) self-released
- Orchestrated Fuzz (2012) self-released
- Alright Alright Alright Alright Alright (2011) self-released

== Side Projects ==
JP Pfertner is also the lead singer/songwriter for the American indie rock band Built By Snow.
