= Black Scorpion (performer) =

American writer, performer, comedian and voice-over artist

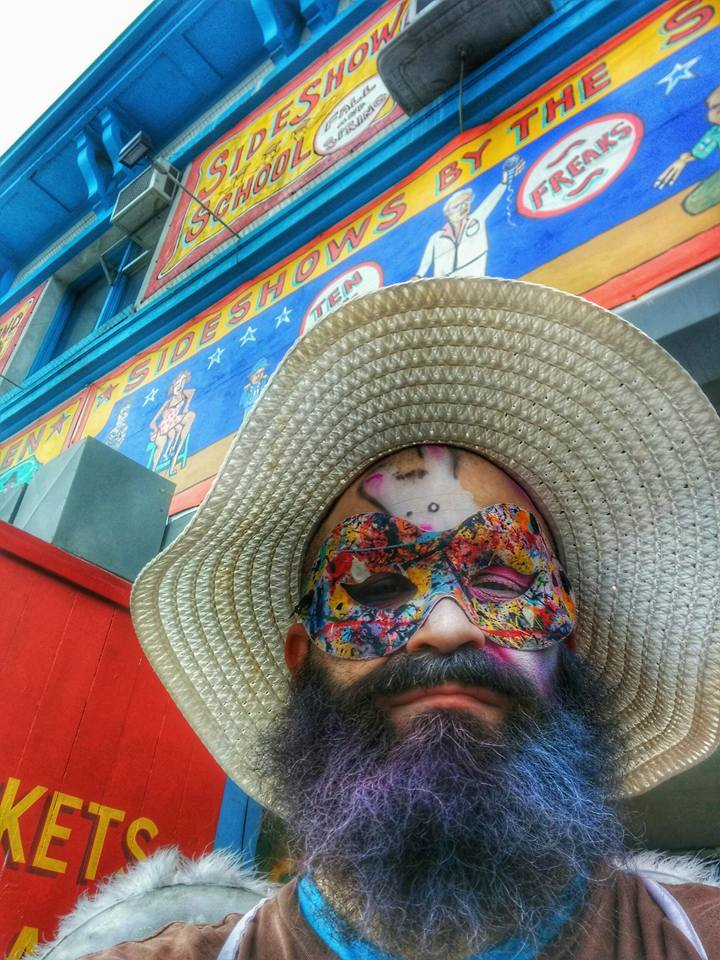
- Born: Jason Black; August 26, 1979 (age 46); Austin, Texas
- Website: http://www.blackforpresident.com

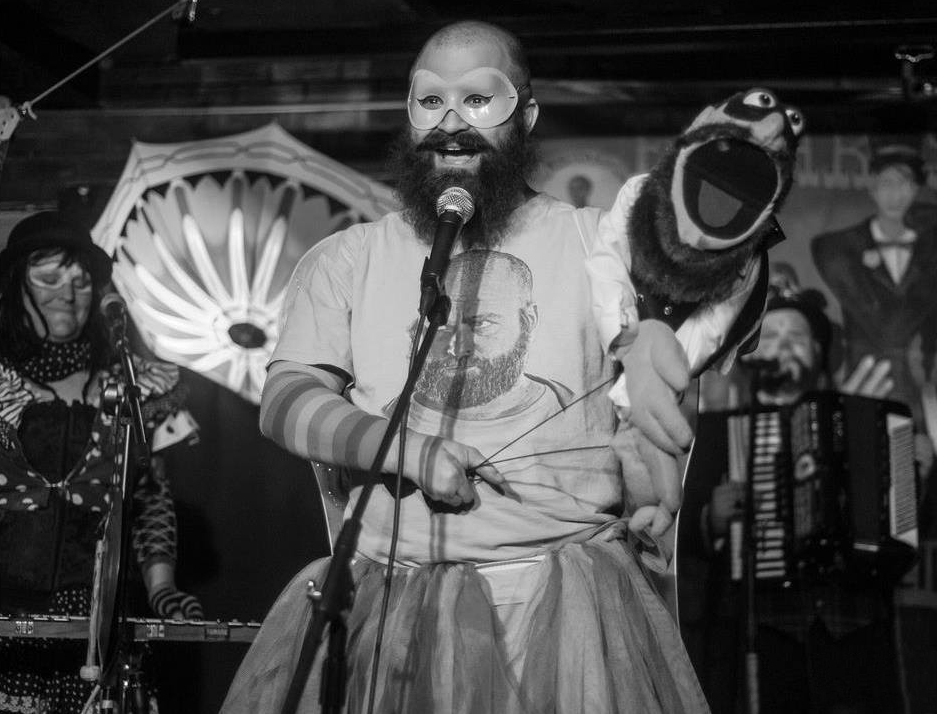
Black Scorpion and Li'l BS.

Black Scorpion (born August 26, 1979, Austin, Texas) is the pseudonym of Jason Black, an American writer, director and performer known mostly for his contribution to the revival of modern freak show and sideshow arts. Known for his bizarre and surreal stage performances, multi-colored self-designed bandit mask and shoes, as well as his "trademark" claws, also called ectrodactyly or "lobster claw syndrome". His feet are like his hands, three toes to a foot.

== Stage show ==
In 2006, after being discovered by Mr. Lifto, Black Scorpion joined the sideshow scene with one of the last traveling authentic vaudevillian freak shows, the 999 Eyes. In 2008 Black Scorpion joined the cast of Coney Island USA's world-famous Sideshows by the Seashore.

On November 30, 2009 Black Scorpion and the Lil Black Scorpion puppet appeared with the cast of Sideshows by the Seashore on the TLC show Cake Boss titled "Freaks, Fast Food & Frightened Frankie!"

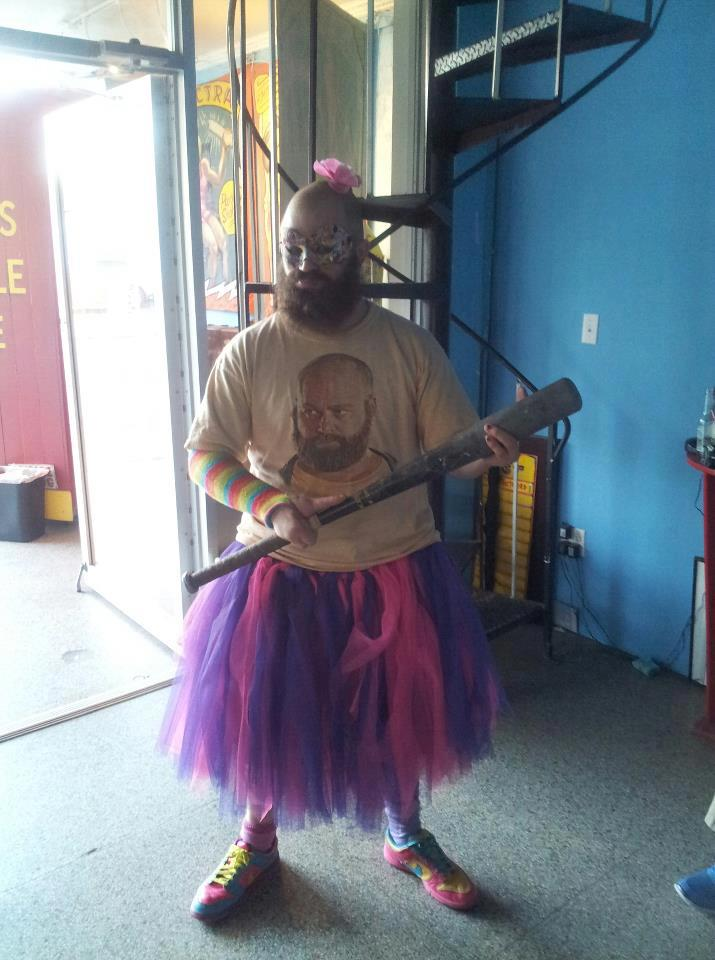
Black Scorpion at Coney Island USA.

Black Scorpion is the inventor of the Hammer Hands illusion and also a co-founder of the Austin, Texas band Built by Snow.

On June 9, 2012, Black Scorpion was shown on the show Oddities. in their episode "Keeping Austin Odd". Black Scorpion illustrated his Hammer Hand illusion.

In 2013 Black Scorpion introduced the world to his newest surreal creation, a Bill Murray-esque puppet as a beheaded P.T. Barnum.

In 2014 Black Scorpion became the consultant for Evan Peters's character, Jimmy Darling, for the fourth season of American Horror Story: Freak Show.
