= Vestigial twin =

Form of parasitic twinning

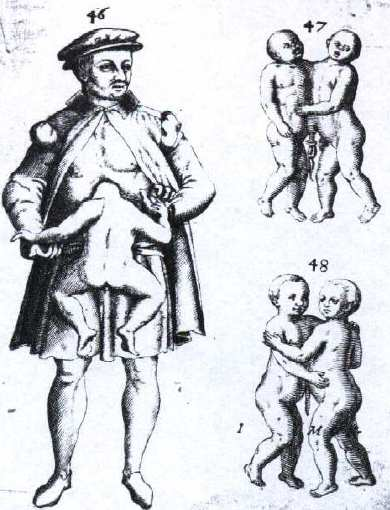
The man on the left is shown with a vestigial parasitic twin; on the right there are two varieties of conjoined twins illustrated.

A vestigial twin is a type of parasitic twin. Such twins are malformed and incomplete, typically consisting entirely as extra limbs or organs. Vestigial twins are always anencephalic and lack consciousness.

Most vestigial limbs are non-functional. Although they may have bones, muscles, and nerve endings, the host does not control these limbs. They can also cause problems for the dominant twin's body; for example, blood may be directed to the parasitic limbs instead of the primary ones, causing the dominant body to suffer from resource shortages.

NB: The presence of six or more digits on the hands or feet (polydactyly) is typically caused by a genetic or chromosomal anomaly and is not considered a case of vestigial twinning.

== Signs and symptoms ==
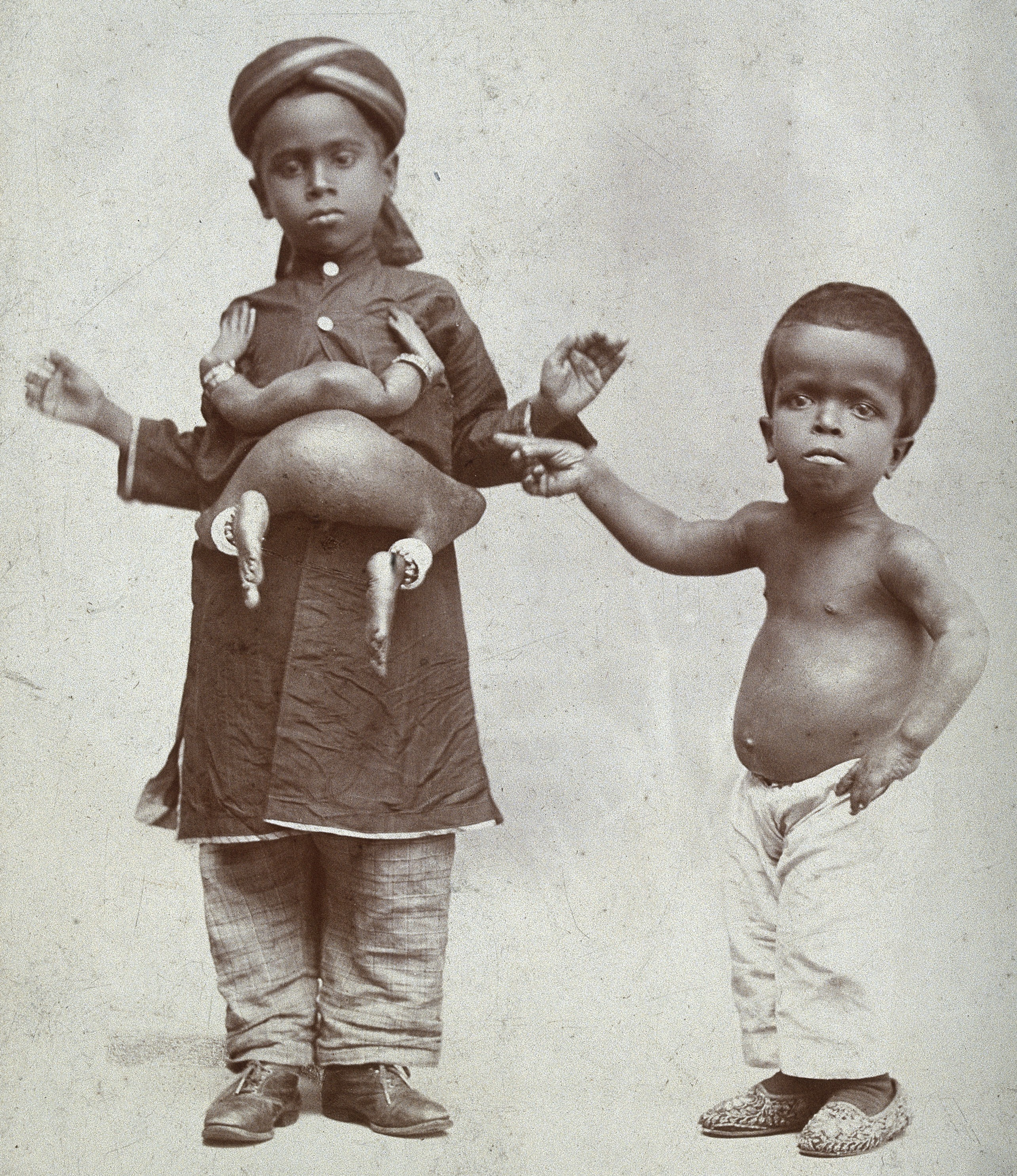
Pictured is a boy that is a vestigial twin. He has a parasitic twin's limbs attached to his abdomen.

Pregnant women generally do not experience different symptoms when carrying vestigial twins than in a normal pregnancy.

After birth, the presentation typically includes an extra extremity attached to the dominant twin's body. Only the dominant fetus will be viable. The limbs attached will contain nerve endings, bones, and tissue. In some cases, the fetus can be born with an attached limb as a "tail". This tail is the extension of the coccygeal vertebra. The parasitic twin's limbs can be attached to the dominant twin at more than one location, for example, the head, torso, pelvis, buttocks, back, etc.

== Cause ==
Vestigial twinning occurs when a fertilized ovum or partially formed embryo splits incompletely. The result is one dominant twin with extra body parts from the vestigial twin. Tail-like tissue may also form around the sacrum. One theory proposes that the use of teratogenic drugs by the mother may be a factor in the development of vestigial parasitic twins. The cause of vestigial twins is still unclear.

There is no way to prevent vestigial twinning. This disease is not contagious and occurs rarely in pregnancies. The Centers for Disease Control and Prevention has no recommendations on this phenomenon, as it is rare.

== Mechanism ==
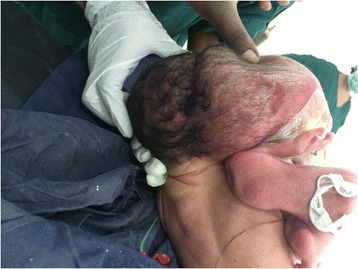
An infant with a mass of cells connected to their head

This disease affects pregnant women expecting twins. The reason these twins do not fully separate is still unknown, though multiple theories exist.

Possible theories include abnormalities in SHH (sonic hedgehog) proteins. SHH proteins are vital for cell development; researchers believe SHH anomalies can cause the twins to be conjoined, after which one stops developing. This leads to the fetus being born with a parasitic twin attached.

Fission theory is another theory researchers believe causes vestigial twinning. Fission theory suggests the two fetuses in the womb began as conjoined twins, and the parasitic twin stopped developing, leading to vestigial twins being born.

The last theory researchers believe can potentially cause vestigial twins is fusion theory. According to fusion theory, two fertilized eggs in the womb fuse together, creating a fetus with the parasitic twin's limbs attached. The dominant twin is impacted because the parasitic twin is somehow attached to their body. Vestigial twinning occurs very rarely, so it is unknown why the dominant twin is born with the parasitic twin's limbs attached.

== Diagnosis ==
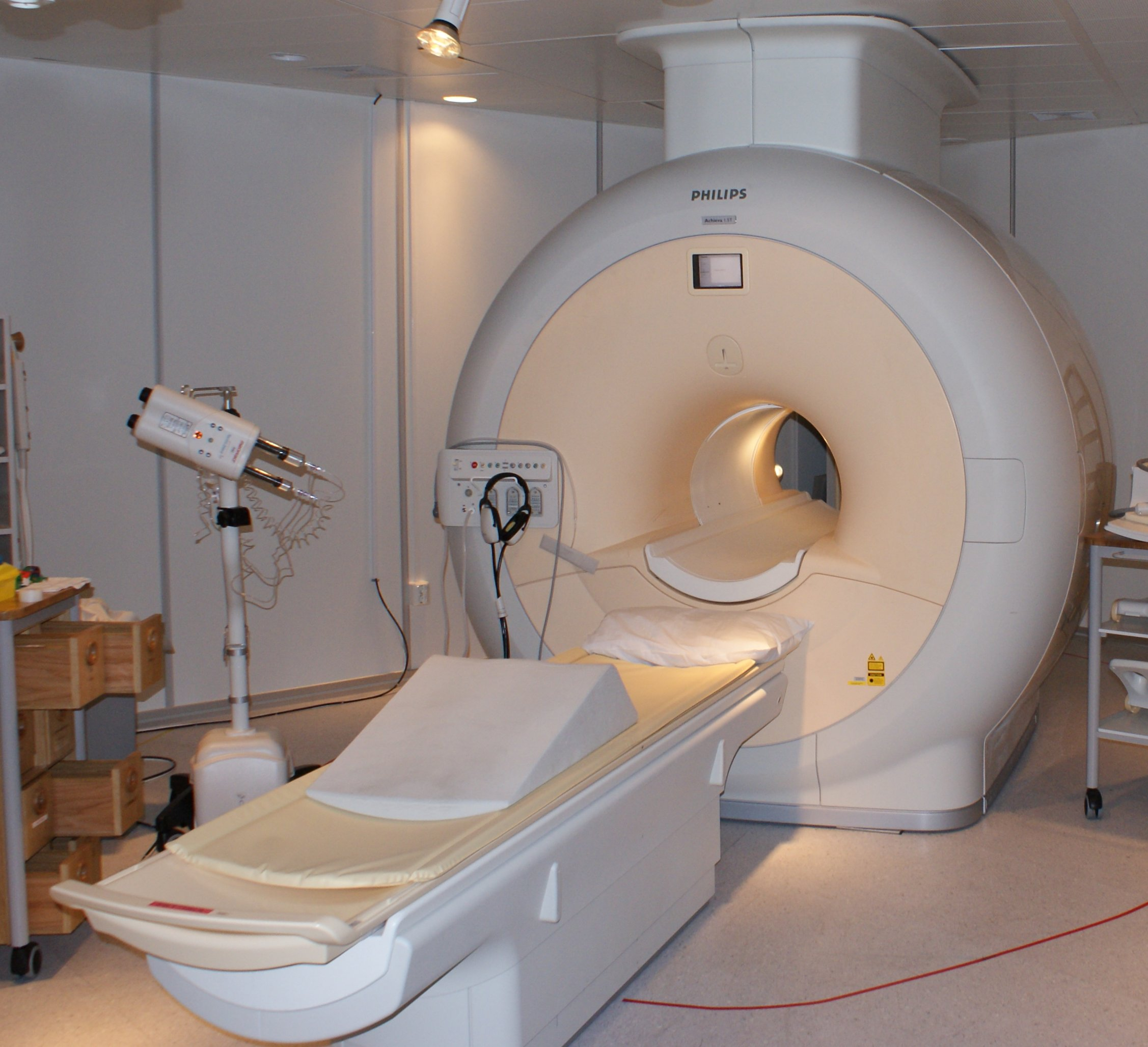
An MRI machine may be used to diagnose vestigial twins.

Early diagnosis can be made by a prenatal ultrasound, which uses sound waves to show the fetus in the womb. However, there have been cases where it was not possible to diagnose the vestigial twin before birth using an ultrasound. There is no way to prevent vestigial twins or diagnose such twins through pregnancy symptoms. Vestigial twins can be diagnosed before birth through ultrasound or other imaging, such as MRI or CT scan, which can show how the twins are connected. After birth, doctors can diagnose the condition by examining the parasitic twin. An obstetric and gynecology physician can treat and diagnose this patient; however, a pregnant woman would be referred to a maternal and fetal medicine specialist. It is possible to have different surgeons assigned to the case to assist with removing the parasitic twin. There have been cases where it is difficult to visualize the parasitic twins on an ultrasound, which would cause a delay in diagnosis until birth. If the expecting mother does not receive prenatal visits, diagnosis may be delayed. However, once the vestigial twins are born they would be easily diagnosed during a physical exam.

== Treatment ==
Treatment for vestigial twins typically includes having surgery to remove the parasitic twin. If the parasitic twin is not removed, the risk for further complications increases significantly. The twin supporting the parasitic twin can have complications. Therefore, the best course of treatment would be to remove the attached parasitic twin. A healthcare provider would schedule additional tests to check to see if the fetus has any complications and treat them. Treatment for other complications would be different based on each case.

After the fetus undergoes the procedure to remove the parasitic twin, there is a risk of developing infection, hernia, and typical surgical complications. There are no holistic treatment options other than leaving the parasitic twin attached; however, leaving the parasitic twin attached to the dominant twin can lead to further complications for the dominant twin. The dominant twin's body can be put under a lot of stress if still attached to the parasitic twin. Surgery is the only treatment to remove the parasitic twin from the dominant twin.

== Prognosis ==
The overall prognosis in the case studies found is typically good once the parasitic twin is separated. If the host twin has complications, such as a hernia or infection, it may require additional treatment. The occurrence does not repeat after the parasitic twin is removed.

It is unclear whether an environmental or hereditary risk factor is associated with vestigial twins. However, researchers believe abnormalities in the SHH protein may increase risk or explain the occurrence of such twins.

== Epidemiology ==
Vestigial twinning is rare; it has been reported to occur in fewer than one in a million births. Women of childbearing ages who are pregnant with twins can be impacted. Twin fetuses still developing in the womb can become vestigial twins, although this is rare; it is unclear whether it affects different ethnicities or races differently. However, rachipagus parasiticus, an extremely rare type of parasitic twinning, is most commonly reported in Ethiopia. In rachipagus parasiticus, the parasitic twin is attached to the spine.

== Research Directions ==
No clinical trials currently exist for vestigial parasitic twins. Because this is so rare, there are not enough known patients to develop drug treatments. It is unclear if any medications can be used to prevent or treat vestigial parasitic twins; however, surgery to separate the twins has shown positive outcomes. Researchers have two theories about what causes vestigial parasitic twins: fission theory and fusion theory.

1. Fission theory proposes that a single egg began splitting but stopped prematurely.
2. Fusion theory proposes that two initially separate fertilized eggs in the womb ended up fusing together.

Another potential cause researchers are investigating is abnormalities in SHH proteins. SHH, sonic hedgehog protein, plays an important role in the development of cells. During embryonic development, SHH is responsible for shaping the body, cell specialization, and cell development. Researchers believe that potential abnormalities in this protein can put women at higher risk for potentially having vestigial parasitic twin pregnancies.
