= Frank Lentini =

Showman

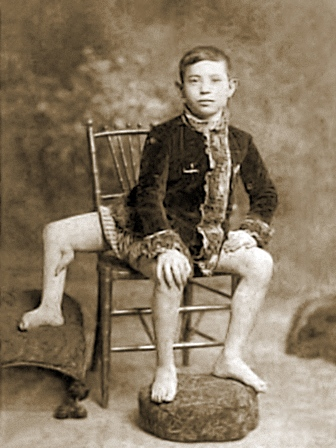
- Photograph of Lentini as a child before 1900
- Born: Francesco A. Lentini; 18 May 1889; Rosolini, Italy
- Died: 21 September 1966 (aged 77); Jackson, Tennessee, US
- Height: 169cm (5 ft 6 in)
- Spouse: Theresa Murray (m. 1907–1935) Helen Eleanor Shupe (m. 1935–1966)
- Partner: Helen Eleanor Shupe (1935–1966)
- Children: Josephine, Ned, Francis Jr and James

Francesco "Frank" Lentini (18 May 1889 – 21 September 1966) was an Italian-American sideshow performer whose career spanned more than 40 years. Born in Rosolini, Sicily, Lentini had a parasitic twin that gave him a third leg, an additional foot, and a partial second pelvis. He emigrated to the United States as a child and performed with the Ringling Brothers Circus, Barnum and Bailey Circus, and Buffalo Bill's Wild West Show.

Lentini was known by the stage names "The Great Lentini", the "Three-Legged Football Player", and "The King". During his performances, he often kicked a football with his third leg, which became a regular part of his act.

== Early life ==
Lentini was born at 8 Gintoli Street, Rosolini, Sicily, on 18 May 1889. Delivered by midwife Maria Alberino, he was the fifth of 12 children (seven sisters and five brothers) in his family. Disgraced initially, his parents gave him into the care of his aunt, the wife of his uncle Corrado Falco.

== Medical condition ==
Lentini was born with a parasitic twin. The undeveloped twin was attached at the base of his spine and consisted of a pelvic bone, a rudimentary set of male genitalia, and a fully formed third leg extending from the right side of his hip. A small foot also projected from the knee of the extra leg.

At the age of four months, he was examined by a specialist in Naples to determine whether the extra limbs could be surgically removed, but an operation was considered too dangerous because of the risk of paralysis.

By the age of five, Lentini was able to bend and straighten the limb, although it could not support his weight for walking.

His two primary legs measured 99 cm (3 ft 3 in) and 97 cm (3 ft 2 in), respectively. The extra leg measured 91 cm (3 ft 0 in) and ended in a clubfoot. He joked that, despite having three legs, he still did not have a matching pair.

== Sideshow career ==
He was exhibited in numerous cities, including London, in 1897. When he was eight, Magnano, who ran a travelling puppet show, brought him to Middletown and Lentini's family moved to the US. Lentini then entered the sideshow business as The Great Lentini, joining the Ringling Brothers Circus. He gained US citizenship at the age of 30. His career spanned over 40 years and he worked with every major circus and sideshow, including Barnum and Bailey and Buffalo Bill's Wild West Show. Lentini was so respected among his peers that he was often called "The King".

In his youth, Lentini used his third leg to kick a soccer ball across the stage—hence his show name, the Three-Legged Football Player.

== Marriage and children ==
At the age of 18, Lentini married Theresa Murray, who was three years younger than him, on 6 August 1907. The couple had four children: Giuseppina (Josephine), Natale (Ned), Francesco (Frank) Jr., and Giacomo (James).

After about 28 years of marriage, Lentini and Theresa separated around 1935. He subsequently began a relationship with Helen Eleanor Shupe, with whom he lived for the remainder of his life. They remained together for about 31 years, until Lentini's death in 1966.

== Death ==
Lentini died of lung failure in Jackson, Tennessee, on 21 September 1966, at the age of 77.

== Legacy ==
Jonathan Redavid portrayed him in the 2017 film The Greatest Showman.

Frank Lentini is featured on the back cover of Seattle-based rock band Alice in Chains' self-titled 1995 album.
