= Rudy Santos =

Filipino man with a parasitic twin

- Born: Leonico Rudy Santos; 1953
- Died: December 2022 (aged 68–69)
- Occupation: Freakshow performer
- Years active: 1970-1980
- Known for: Oldest recorded man with a parasitic twin
- Children: 1

Leoncio Rudy Santos (1953 - December 2022), also known by his stage name Octoman, was a Filipino with a parasitic twin. He was the longest living person ever recorded with this condition. Remaining from his parasitic sibling were an extra leg and couple of arms, including shoulders and an extra pair of nipples, all of them attached to Santos's pelvis and protruding from his abdomen. Also, an undeveloped head was attached to his sternum, presenting an incipient ear and a patch of hair. Additionally, Santos's own right leg was severely deformed, ending on a stump at the height of the knee, preventing him from walking without the use of crutches.

== Early life and career ==
Belonging to an extremely poor family, during the 1970s and 1980s, Santos earned a living by appearing in freak shows. He was sometimes the main attraction in travelling fairs. According to a source, at one point in his life, he gained 20,000 pesos every night.

== Medical condition ==
Santos was born with a parasitic twin. The undeveloped twin was attached to his chest, abdomen, and pelvis. It consisted of two additional arms, an extra leg, an undeveloped head with a partially formed ear and a patch of hair, an extra pair of nipples, and additional shoulders. The parasitic twin depended on Santos's body for its blood supply.

Santos's own right leg was also severely deformed, ending in a stump at about knee height. Throughout his life, he walked with the aid of crutches.

In 2008, at about age 55, Santos was examined by a Filipino surgeon who specialized in the separation of conjoined twins. Doctors determined that surgery to remove the parasitic twin was possible. After considering the operation, Santos chose not to proceed. He explained that after living with his twin for more than 50 years, he had become emotionally attached to it.

== Poverty and examination ==
During the late 1980s, he retired himself into seclusion in Zamboanga City, plunging into ten years of extreme poverty. His wife and daughter joined him. He appeared in the television show Wish Ko Lang!. In the show, he was reunited with his wife, who served as a domestic helper in Manila. From the show, he gained a sari-sari store and a college scholarship for his daughter.
