= Zip the Pinhead =

American freak show performer (1842–1926)

William Henry Johnson (Zip the Pinhead)
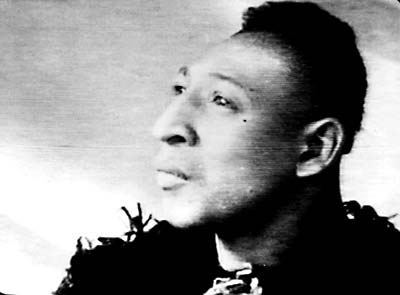
- Born: William Henry Johnson c. 1857 or c. 1842 (Note: Johnson's headstone gives his birth year as 1857, but his death certificate lists his age as 83. The Matthew Brady photo of Johnson taken approx. 1860-1870 seems to depict him as too old to have been born in 1857.); Liberty Corner, New Jersey, U.S.
- Died: April 9, 1926 (aged 68–69 or 83); New York City, New York, U.S.
- Occupation: Freak show performer
- Known for: performer with Ringling Brothers and Barnum and Bailey sideshows, entertainer at Coney Island

William Henry Johnson (c. 1857 or c. 1842 – April 9, 1926), known as Zip the Pinhead, was an American sideshow performer known for his tapered head.

== Early life ==
William Henry Johnson was likely born in Bound Brook, New Jersey, and was one of six children in a very poor African-American family. His parents were William and Mahalia Johnson, former slaves. As he grew, his body developed normally, but his head remained small. His tapering cranium and heavy jaw made him attractive to agents from van Emburgh's Circus in Somerville, New Jersey. His appearance caused many to believe that he was a "pinhead", or microcephalic. Microcephaly patients are characterized by a small, tapering cranium and often have impaired mental faculty. It is debatable, however, whether he was intellectually disabled. His speech capacities were average, contrary to his circus act as mute.

Johnson's parents agreed to allow the circus to display him in return for money. He was billed as a missing link, supposedly caught in Africa and displayed in a cage. He was a popular attraction, and his success led his agent to show his charge to showman P.T. Barnum.

Barnum purchased the right to display Johnson from the circus and gave him a new look. A furry suit was made to fit him, and his hair was shaped to a tiny point that further accented his sloping brow. Finally, he was given the name, "Zip the Pinhead", the "What-Is-It?," or the "Man-Monkey".

== Career ==
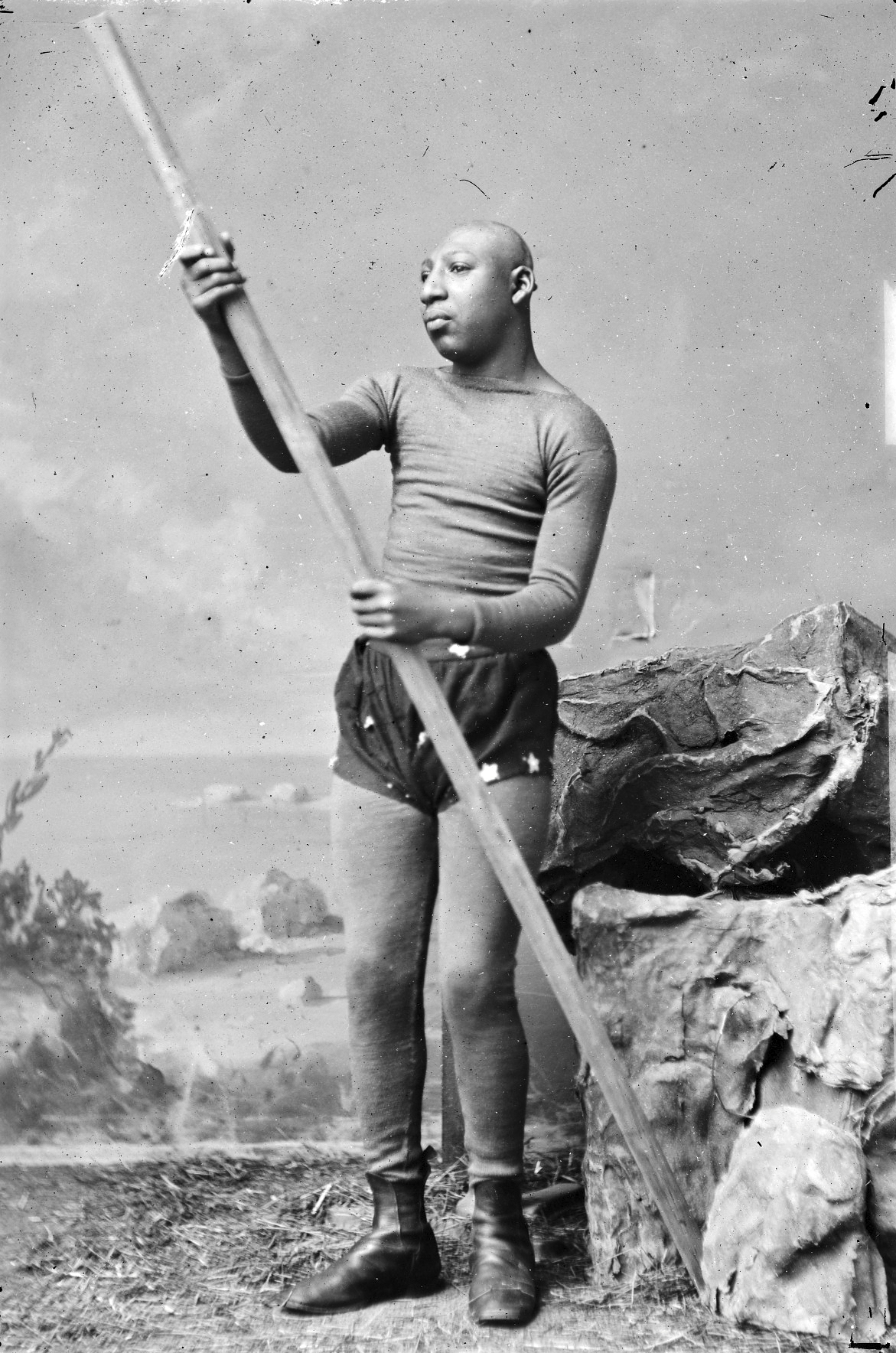
A photo by Matthew Brady, taken c. 1860–1870.

Johnson was first exhibited by Barnum when he was 18, and his career lasted longer than 60 years. He was eventually renamed "Zip" after "Zip Coon", an archetypal character in minstrel shows. Johnson was "[l]aughed at, pelted with coins, called a 'cross between a nigger and a baboon'".

Zip's early performances were set against a background story. It was told to the audience that a tribe of "missing links" had been discovered in Africa, and that Zip was one of these. It was further explained that the "wild man", the "What-Is-It", subsisted on raw meat, nuts, and fruit, but was learning to eat more civilized fare such as bread and cake.

Zip would then be revealed in a cage where he could rattle the bars and screech. This act was tremendously successful for Barnum, and Zip was as big an attraction to Barnum's American Museum as the famous Siamese twins, Chang and Eng Bunker. (Note: The cited reference says, "Zip didn't upset sideshow visitors the way [some other performers] do... that's why he was more successfully exhibited than any other freak outside Tom Thumb" (p. 295).)

In later years, Zip became more "civilized" in his act. He shared the stage with other anomalies, including his friends "Texas Giant" Jim Tarver, "Tallest Man in the World" Jack Earle and Koo-Koo the Bird Girl. He traveled extensively with the Ringling Brothers circus.

In 1860, he was visited at the museum by Albert Edward, the Prince of Wales; his photo was taken by Civil War photographer Mathew Brady.

Throughout this period, Zip's best friend and manager was Captain O.K. White. White conscientiously looked after Zip's interests. He also gave Zip one of his prized possessions, a tuxedo.

In his later years, Zip eschewed traveling in favor of performing at Coney Island. One Sunday afternoon in 1925, Zip heard a little girl cry for help. He noticed the girl waving her arms in the ocean and swam out to rescue her.

Zip caught bronchitis in early 1926, and despite the wishes of his doctor and Captain White, he continued to perform his part in the stage play Sunny at the New Amsterdam Theater. Upon the closing of the play, he returned to his home in Bound Brook, New Jersey, where he was cared for by his doctor, Captain White, and his sister. When his condition worsened, he was moved to Bellevue Hospital in New York City, where he died.

It is estimated that during his 67 years in show business, Zip entertained more than one hundred million people.

Zip the Pinhead was buried in Plot 399 of the Bound Brook Cemetery on April 28, 1926. A small gravestone bearing the inscription "William H. Johnson, 1857–1926" marks his resting place.

== Inspiration ==
Johnson is part of the inspiration for Bill Griffith's comics character, Zippy the Pinhead. He was featured in the "Freak Show Tech" episode of the History Channel series Wild West Tech. Although not the first pinhead in the American circus sideshows, his costumes and presentation led to the display of several other microcephalic people to the American public.

== See also ==
- Human zoos
- Krao Farini, one of several sideshow performers billed as a "missing link"
- Ota Benga
