= Parasitic twin =

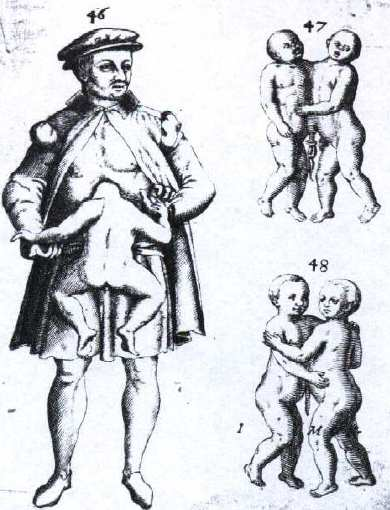
- Illustration of a man with a parasitic twin, alongside illustrations of two configurations of conjoined twins
- Specialty: Maternal–fetal medicine, neonatology

A parasitic twin, also known as an asymmetrical twin or unequal conjoined twin, occurs when a twin embryo begins developing in utero, but the pair does not fully separate, and one embryo maintains dominant development at the expense of the other. It results from the same processes that also produces vanishing twins and conjoined twins, and may represent a continuum between the two. In parasitic twins, one ceases development during gestation and is vestigial to a mostly fully formed, otherwise healthy individual twin. The undeveloped twin is termed as parasitic, because it is incompletely formed or wholly dependent on the body functions of the complete fetus. The independent twin is called the autosite. The autosite, together with the parasite, are collectively referred to as heteropagus twins.

Typically, the parasitic twin is unable to speak due to an underdeveloped or absent brain, though they may be able to move their mouths or hands. There have been no known records of a parasitic twin that has been able to speak.

== Variants ==
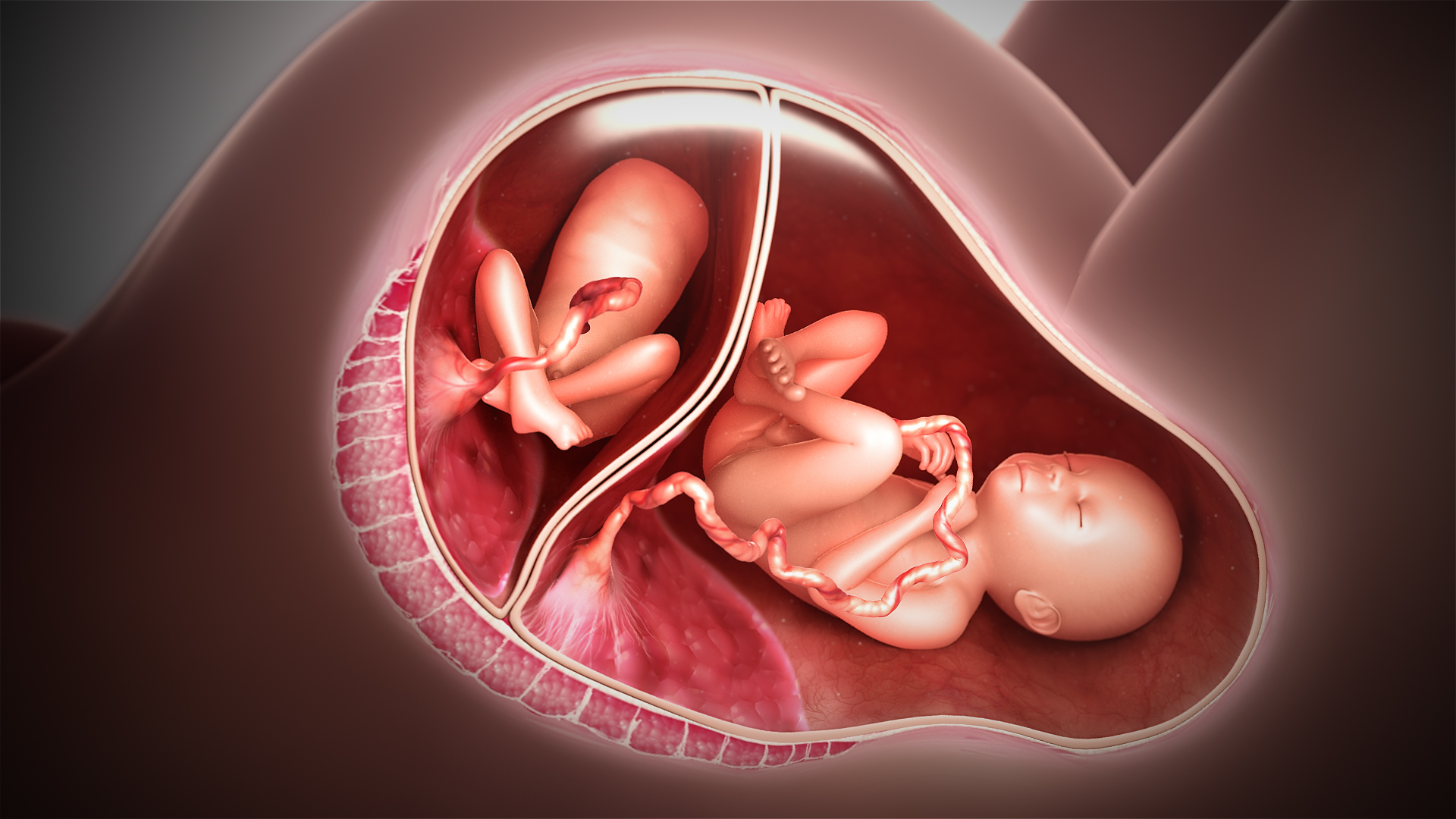
TRAP syndrome. The acardiac twin, left, cannot pump its own blood. The pump twin, right, supplies blood to the parasitic twin.

=== TRAP sequence ===
The twin reversed arterial perfusion, or TRAP sequence, results in an 'acardiac twin', a parasitic twin that fails to develop a head, arms and a heart. The parasitic twin, little more than a torso with or without legs, receives its blood supply from the host twin by means of an umbilical cord-like structure, much like a fetus in fetu, except the acardiac twin is outside the autosite's body. The blood received by the parasitic twin has already been used by the normal fetus, and as such is already de-oxygenated, leaving little developmental nutrients for the acardiac twin. Because it is pumping blood for both itself and its acardiac twin, this causes extreme stress on the normal fetus' heart. Many TRAP pregnancies result in heart failure for the healthy twin. This twinning condition usually occurs very early in pregnancy. A rare variant of the acardiac fetus is the acardius acormus where the head is well developed but the heart and the rest of the body are rudimentary. While it is thought that the classical TRAP/Acardius sequence is due to a retrograde flow from the umbilical arteries of the pump twin to the iliac arteries of the acardiac twin resulting in preferential caudal perfusion, acardius acormus is thought to be a result of an early embryopathy.

=== Others ===
Conjoined parasitic twins joined at the head are described as craniopagus or cephalopagus, and occipitalis if joined in the occipital region or parietalis if joined in the parietal region.

Craniopagus parasiticus is a general term for a parasitic head attached to the head of a more fully developed fetus or infant.

Fetus in fetu sometimes is interpreted as a special case of parasitic twin, but may be a distinct entity.

== Gallery ==
=== Human ===
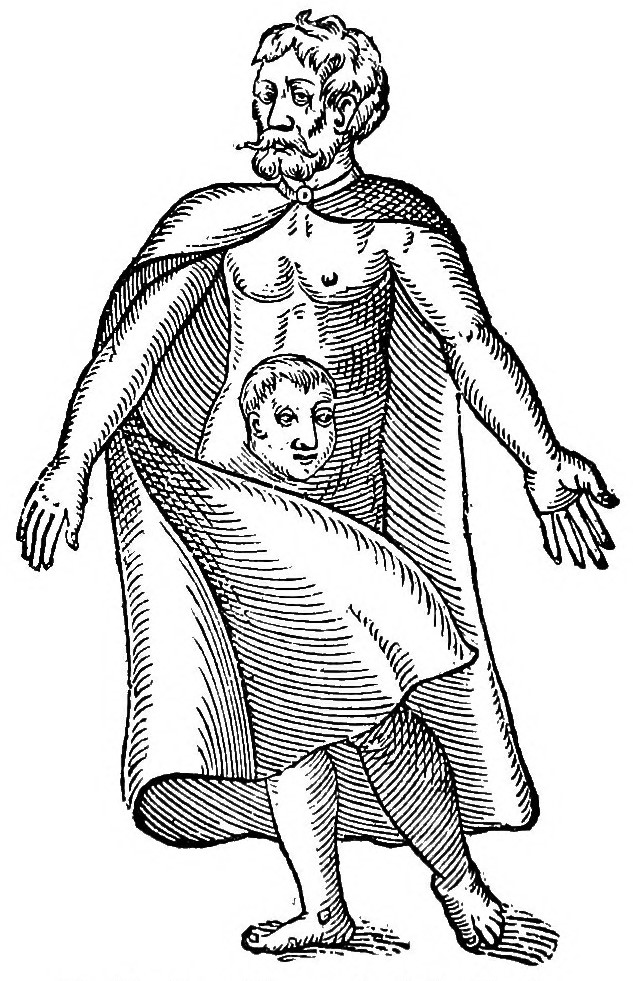
German man, born 1516 (Note: "the same year that peace was made with the Swiss by King Francis")

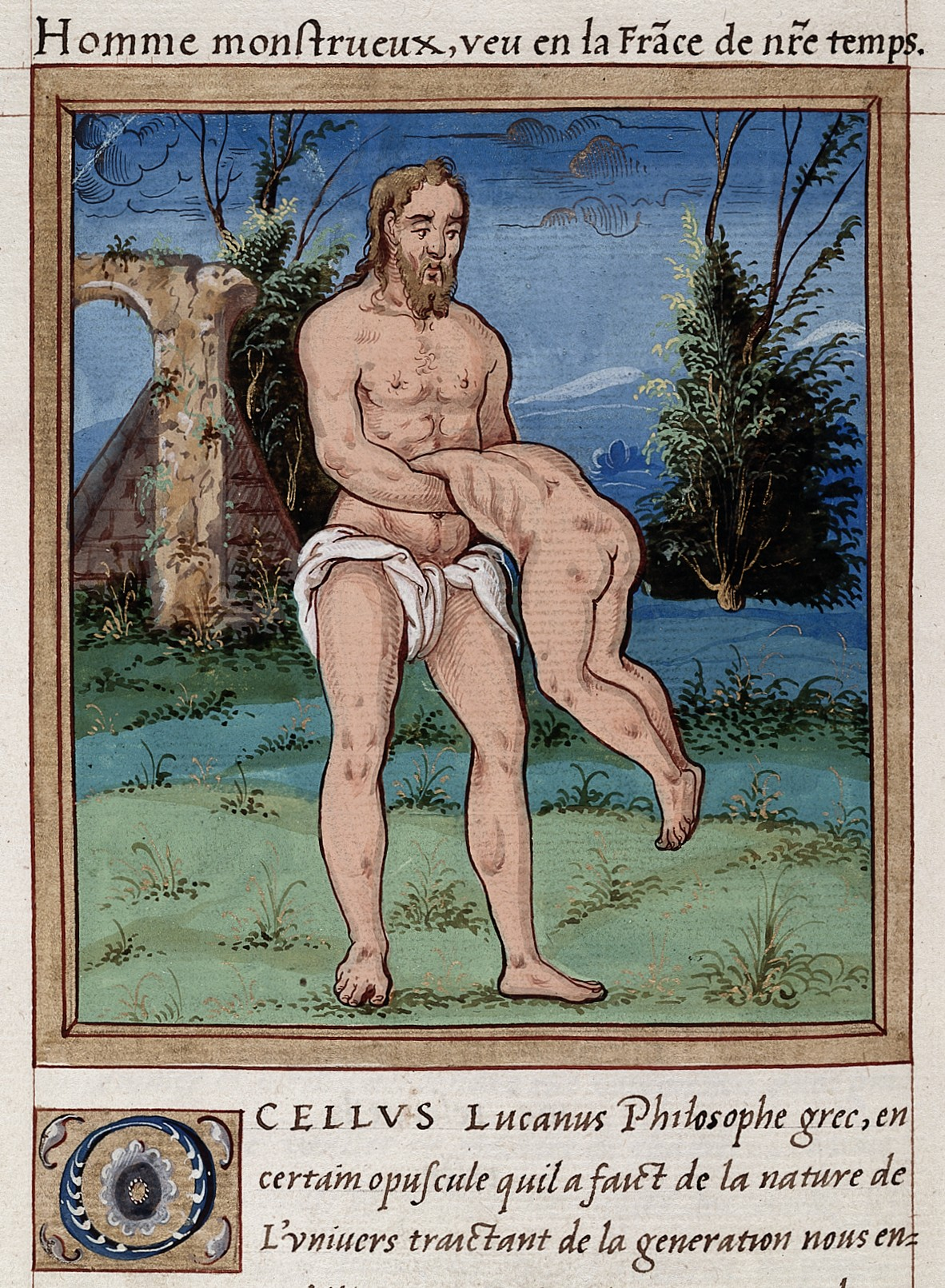
40-year-old man seen in Paris, 1530

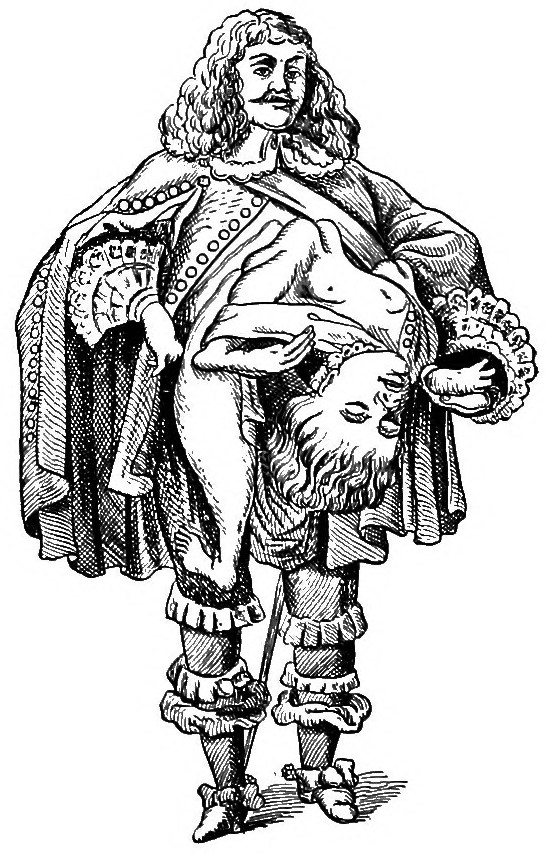
Lazarus and Joannes Baptista Colloredo, born 1617

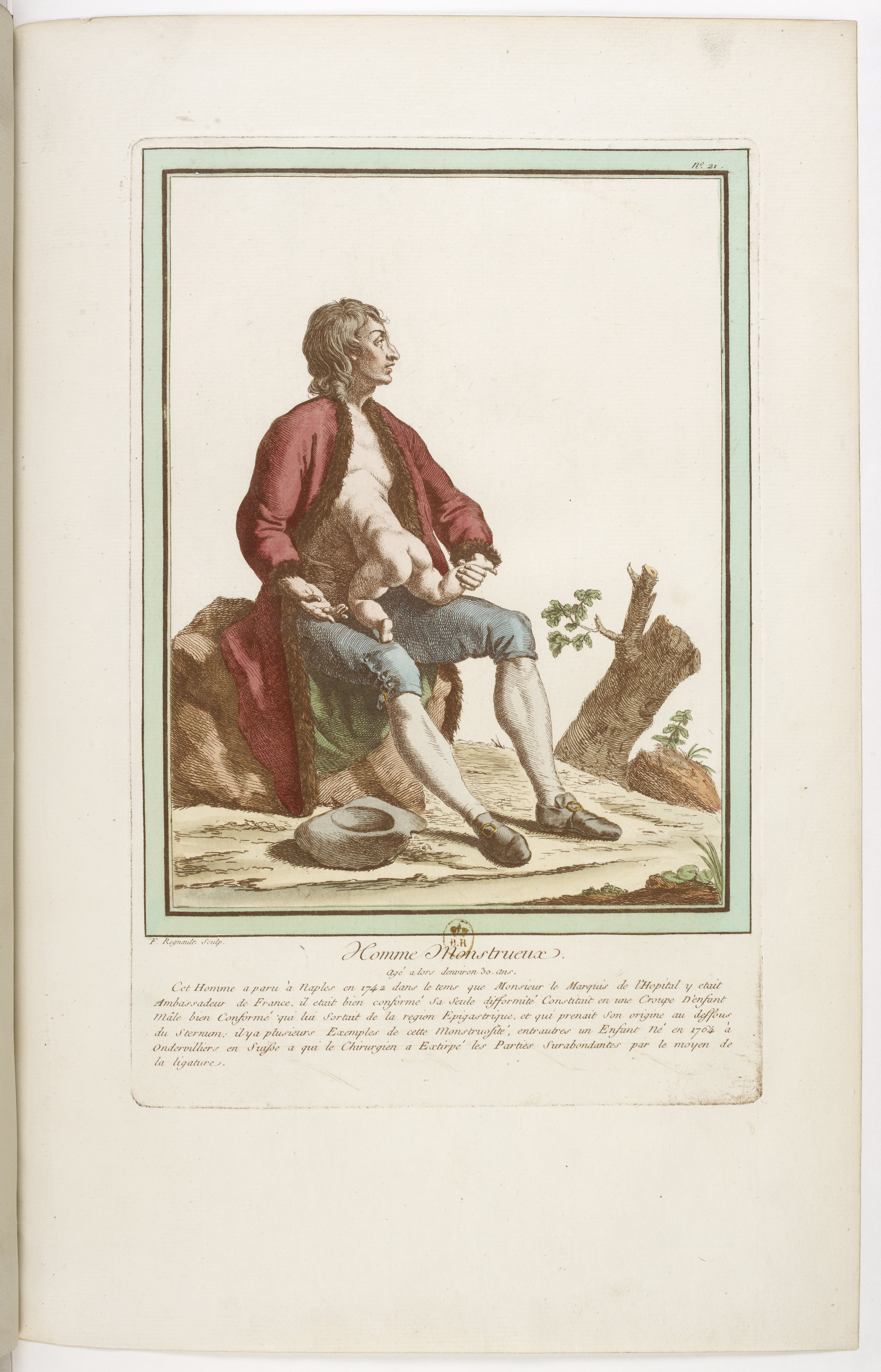
30-year-old Neapolitan man, seen in 1742

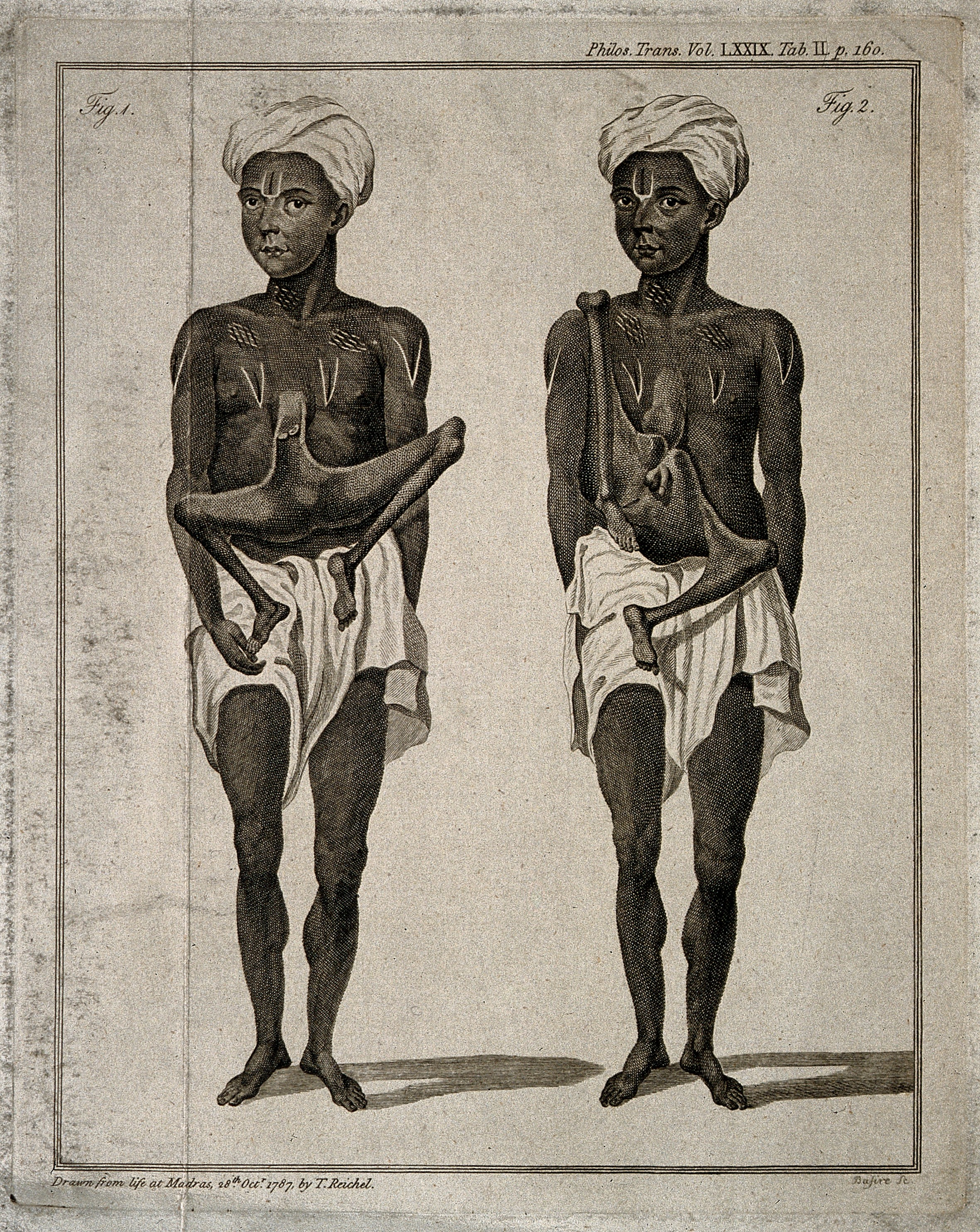
Indian man, 1787

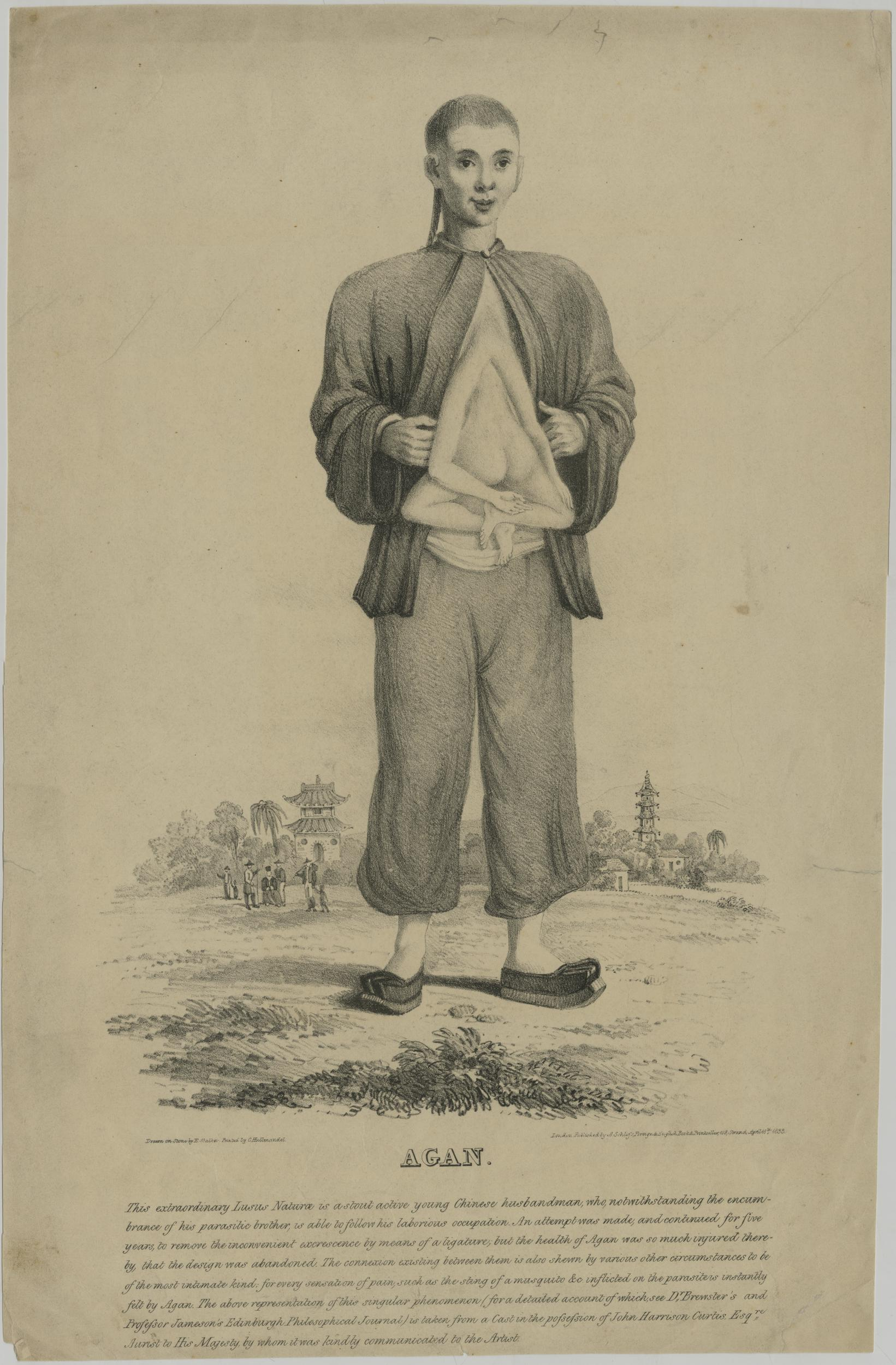
Agan, a Chinese man, 1833

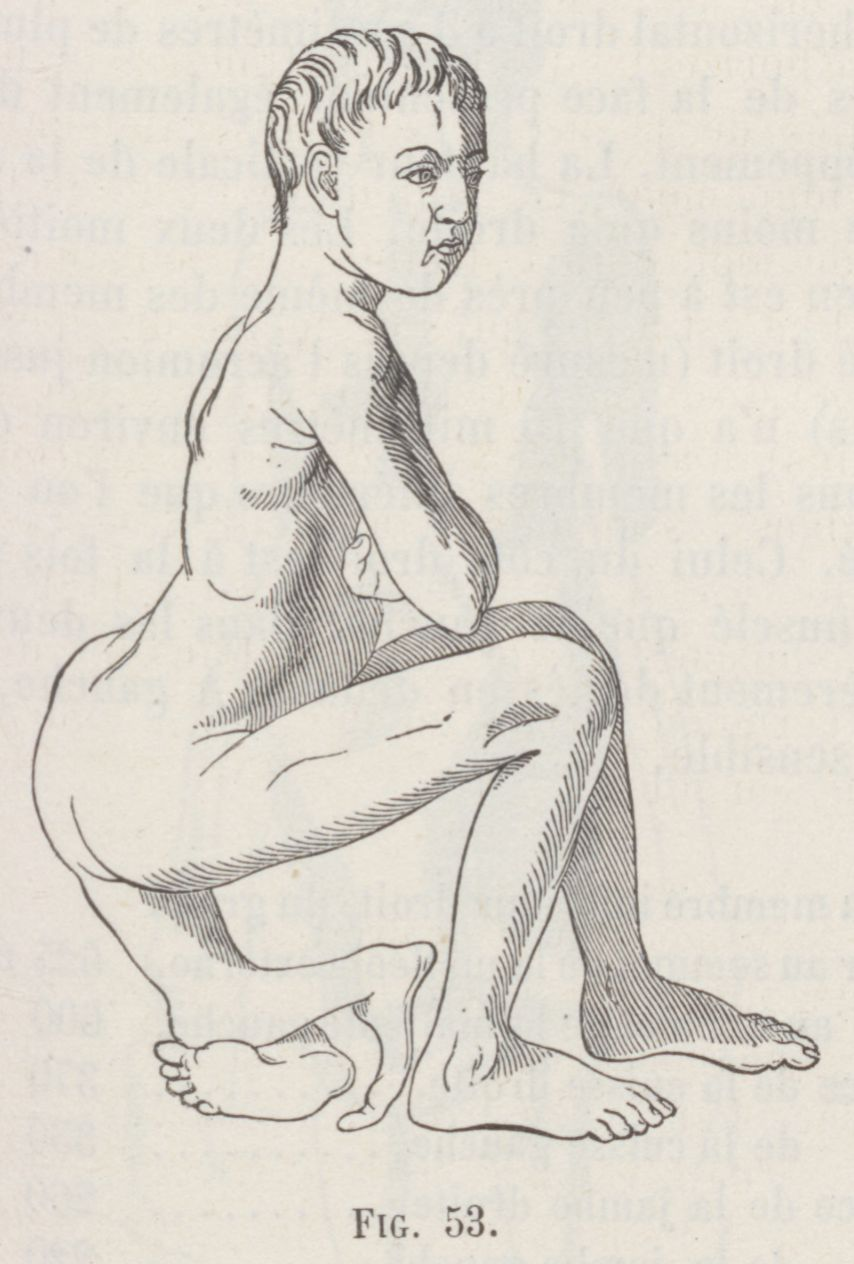
9-year-old Gustav Evrard of Paris, 1839

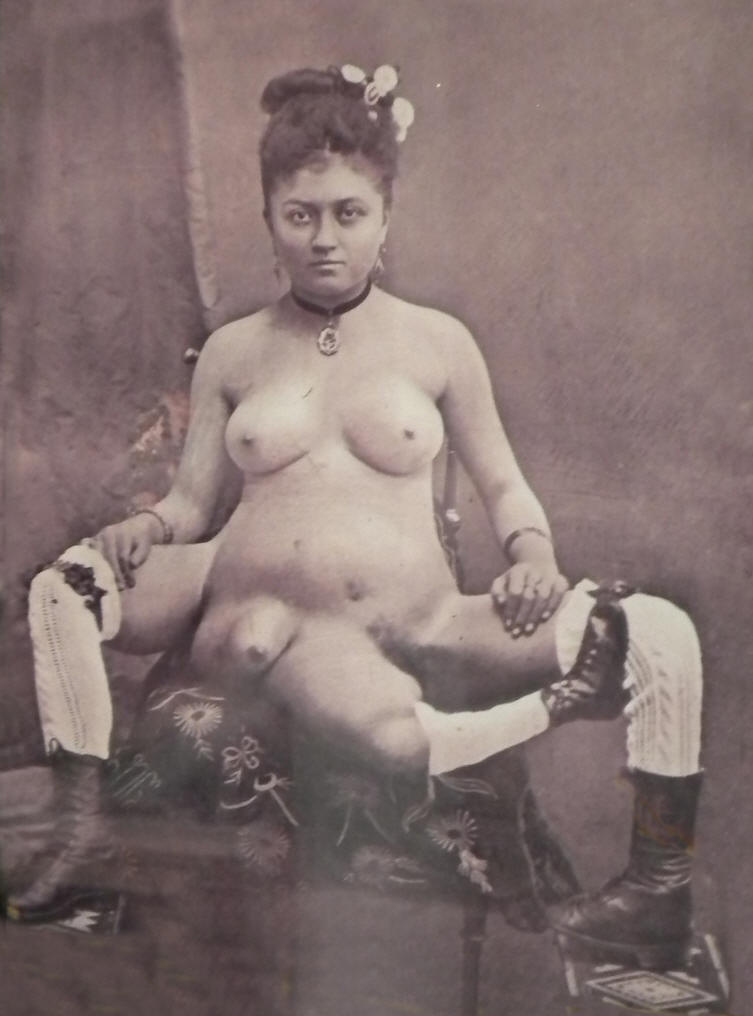
Blanche Dumas of France, born 1860

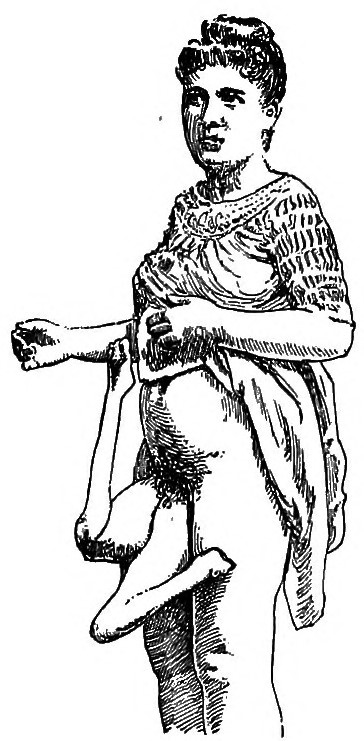
Louise L., born 1869

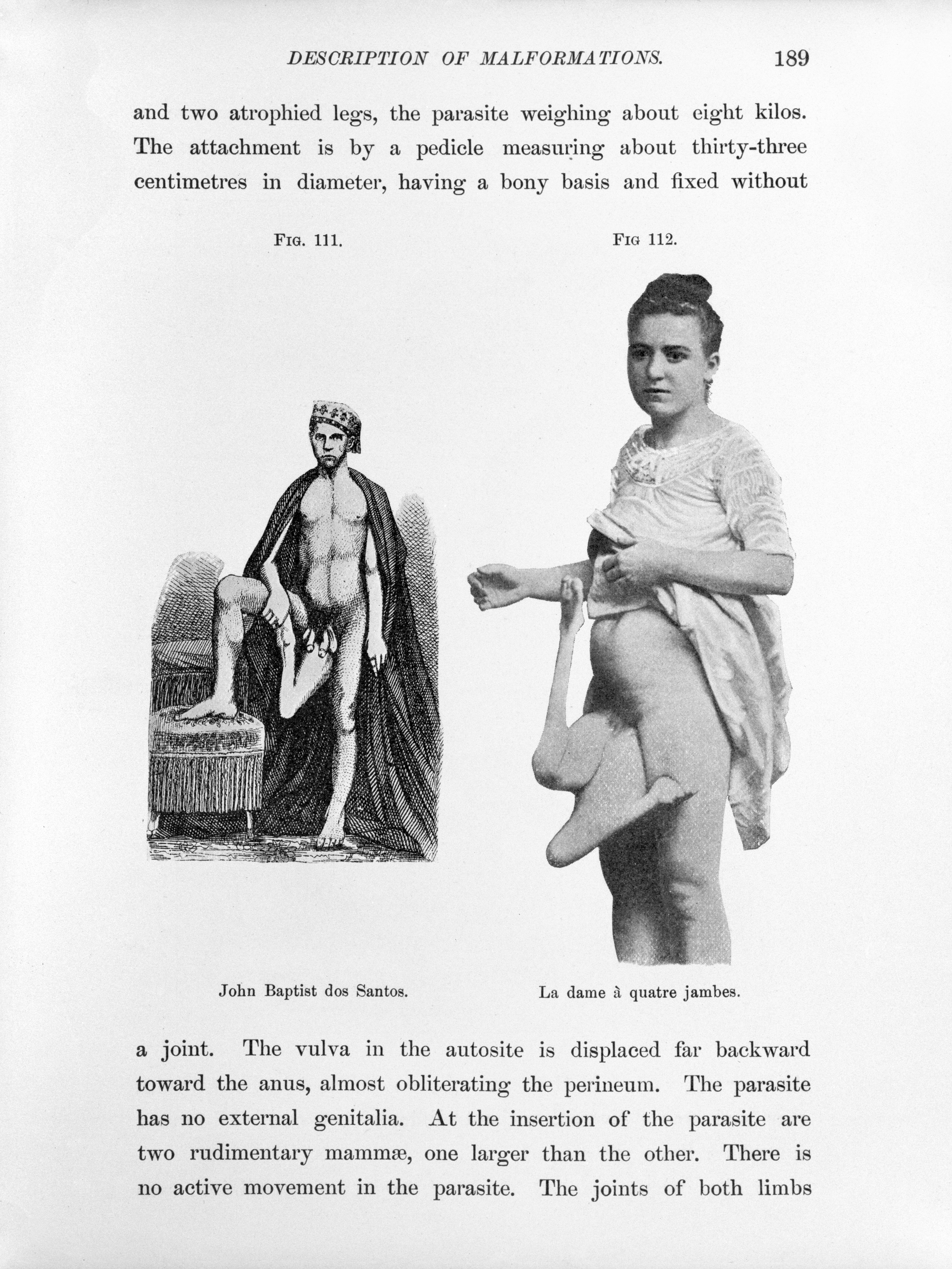
Joao Baptista dos Santos and Louise L. ("la dame à quatre jambes"), 1893

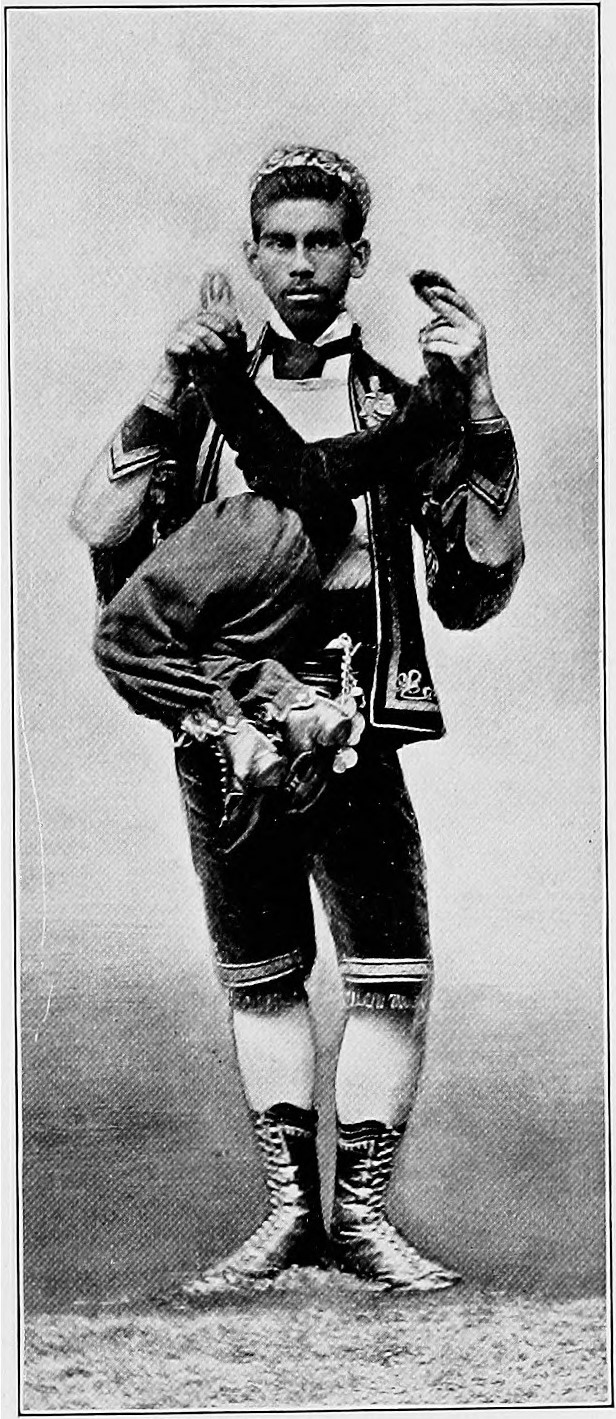
Laloo, 1897

=== Animals ===
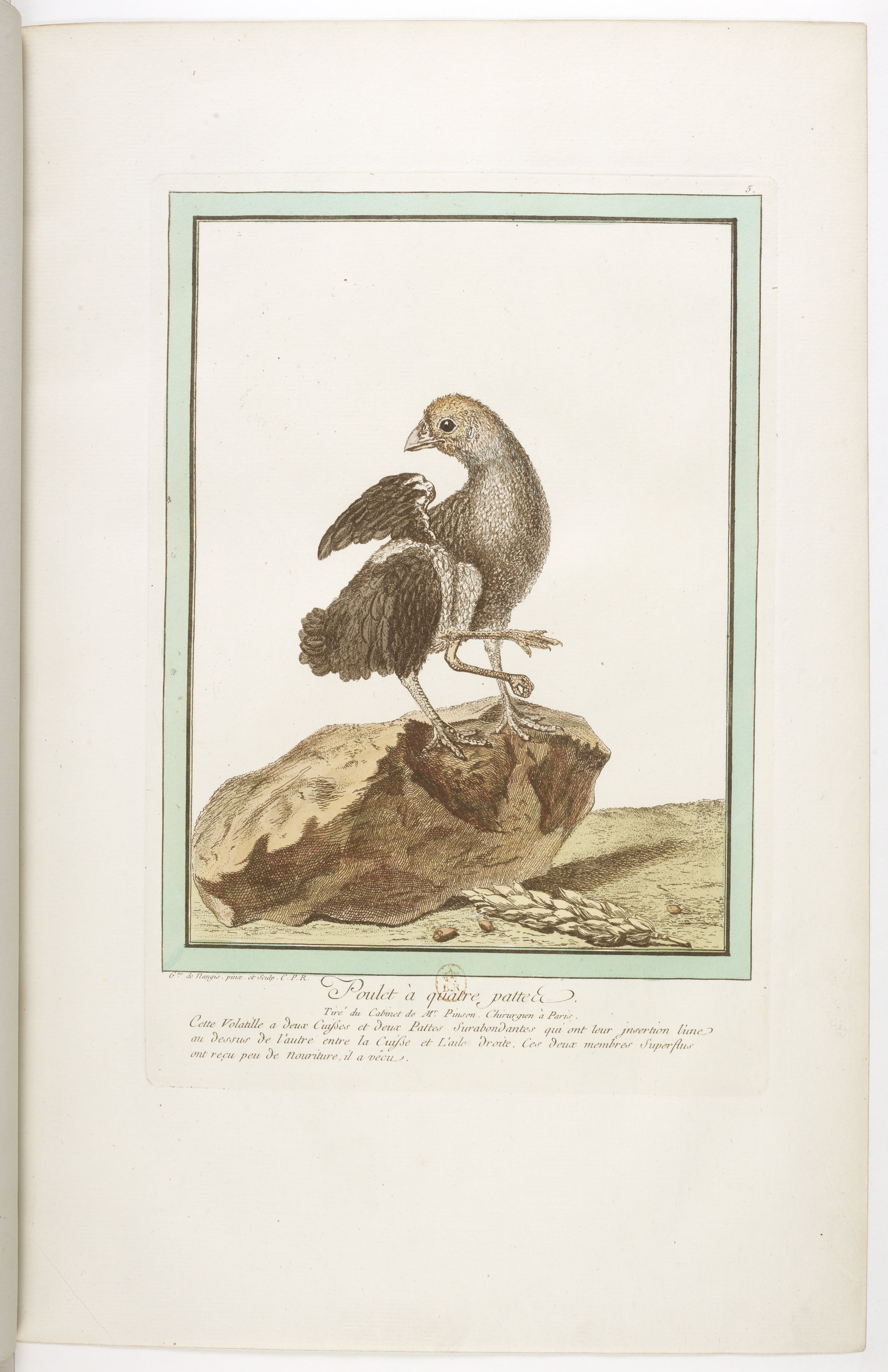
Chicken with two extra lower limbs

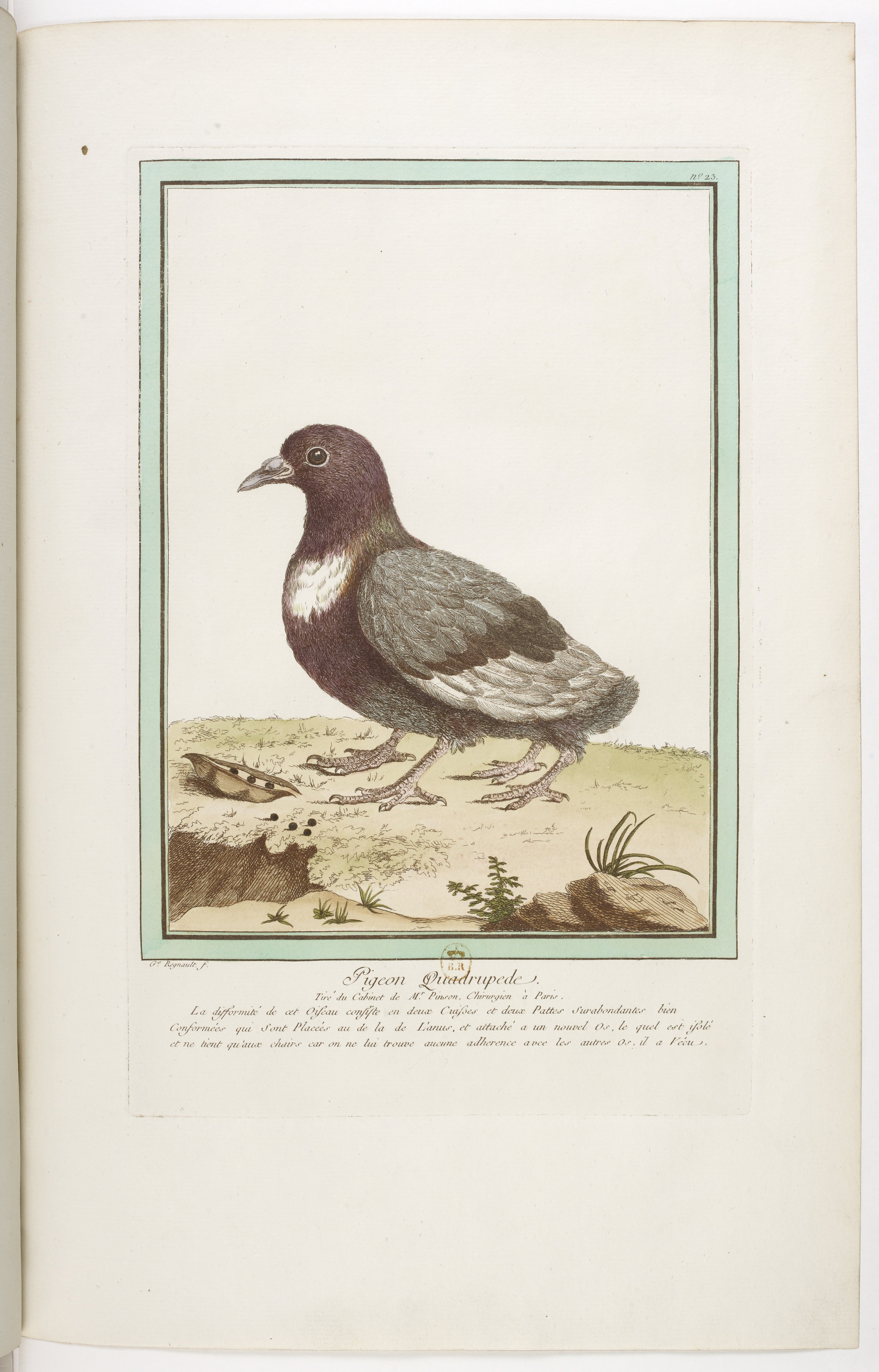
Pigeon with two extra lower limbs

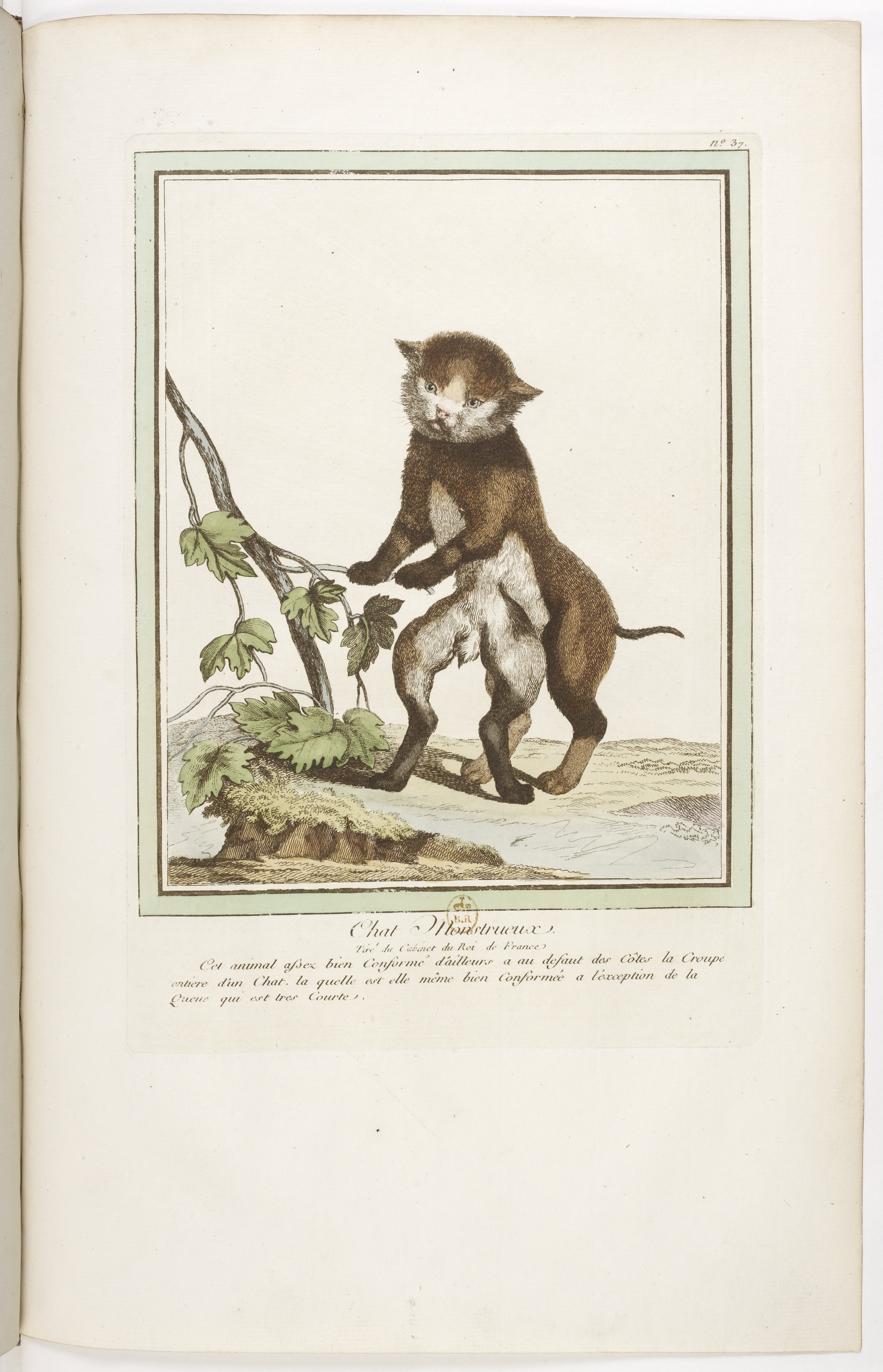
Cat with lower body duplication

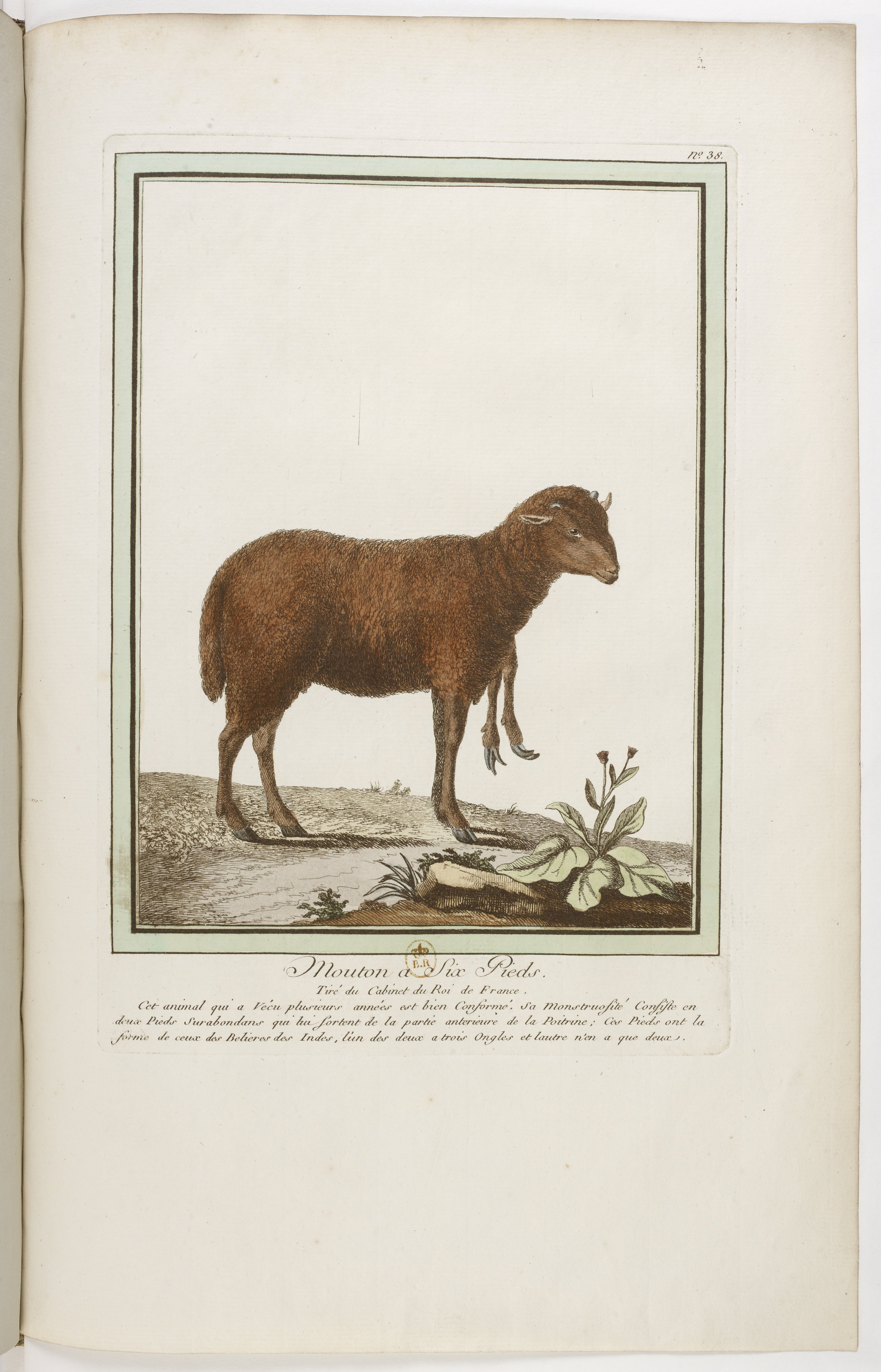
Sheep with two extra front limbs

== See also ==
- Dipygus
- Frank Lentini
- Lakshmi Tatma
- Lazarus and Joannes Baptista Colloredo
- Rudy Santos
- Twin reversed arterial perfusion
- Vestigial twin
