= Chamber of Art and Curiosities, Ambras Castle =

Collection of notable objects in Austria

Coordinates: 47°15′21″N 11°26′2″E

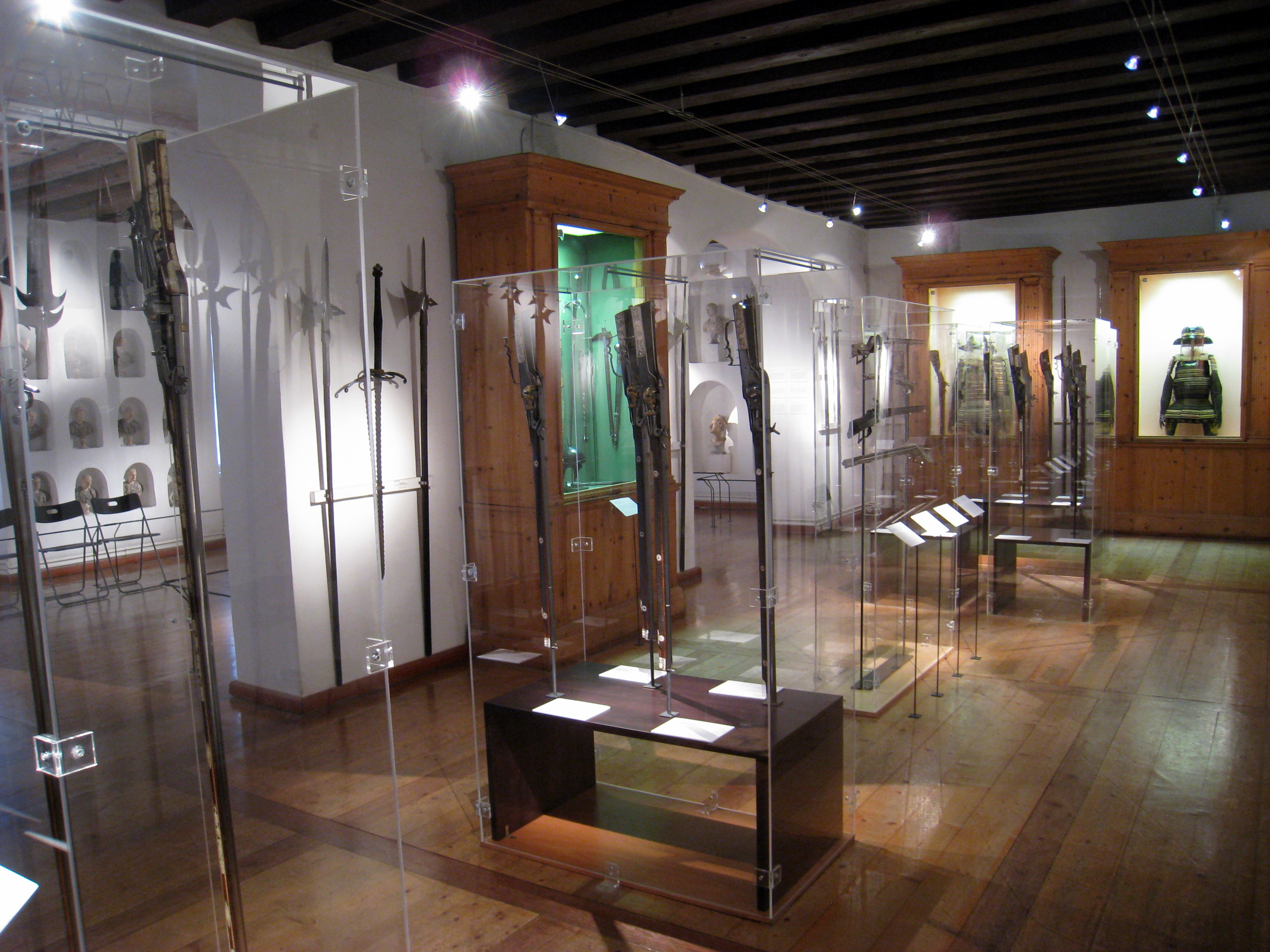
The 'Small Armoury', part of the Chamber of Art and Wonders, Ambras Castle

The Chamber of Art and Curiosities or Chamber of Art and Wonders ("Kunst- und Wunderkammer") is a cabinet of curiosities (German: Kunstkammer) created in the 16th century by Ferdinand II, Archduke of Austria and located in Innsbruck, Austria. Ferdinand II was the sovereign ruler of the County of Tyrol and Further Austria, and a prominent collector of art. He built this museum specifically to showcase his collections (1572–1583, supplement 1589).

Ferdinand II was the first to present a collection according to a systematic concept within a specially constructed museum building. Ambras Castle is perhaps the oldest museum in the world. The Chamber of Art and Curiosities is the only Kunstkammer to have been preserved at its original location.

Examples of items in the collection include armour, weapons, portraits, natural objects, rarities, 'wonders of nature', contemporary scientific instruments, musical instruments, and precious items. In later times, these are classified as artificialia, naturalia, scientifica, exotica, and mirabilia. The Strasser Collection of Glass (German: Glassammlung Strasser) boasts precious glassware from the Renaissance and Baroque periods. The Habsburg Portrait Gallery (German: Habsburger Porträtgalerie) is laid out across three floors, and open to visitors in summer. The gallery hosts painting from artists such as Hans Burgkmair, Lucas Cranach the Younger, Giuseppe Arcimboldo, Peter Paul Rubens, and Diego Velázquez. Today, these collections are administered by the KHM-Museumsverband, part of the Kunsthistorisches Museum, Vienna.

== Collection ==
A variety of uncommon objects are on display, including a woodcarving of "Death" by Hans Leinberger, goblets, coral collections and artifacts, glass figures, centerpieces, mechanical toys, clocks, and various instruments. Several Asian artifacts are also displayed, including a suit of samurai armor, a Ryukyu bowl, and a silk painting from China.

=== Paintings ===
The Ambras collection contains a number of unique portraits, and some of the subjects were perceived at the time as "Wonder of Nature". The painters are not known. Giants and dwarfs, people with hirsutism and others, are shown, including:

==== Gregor Baci ====
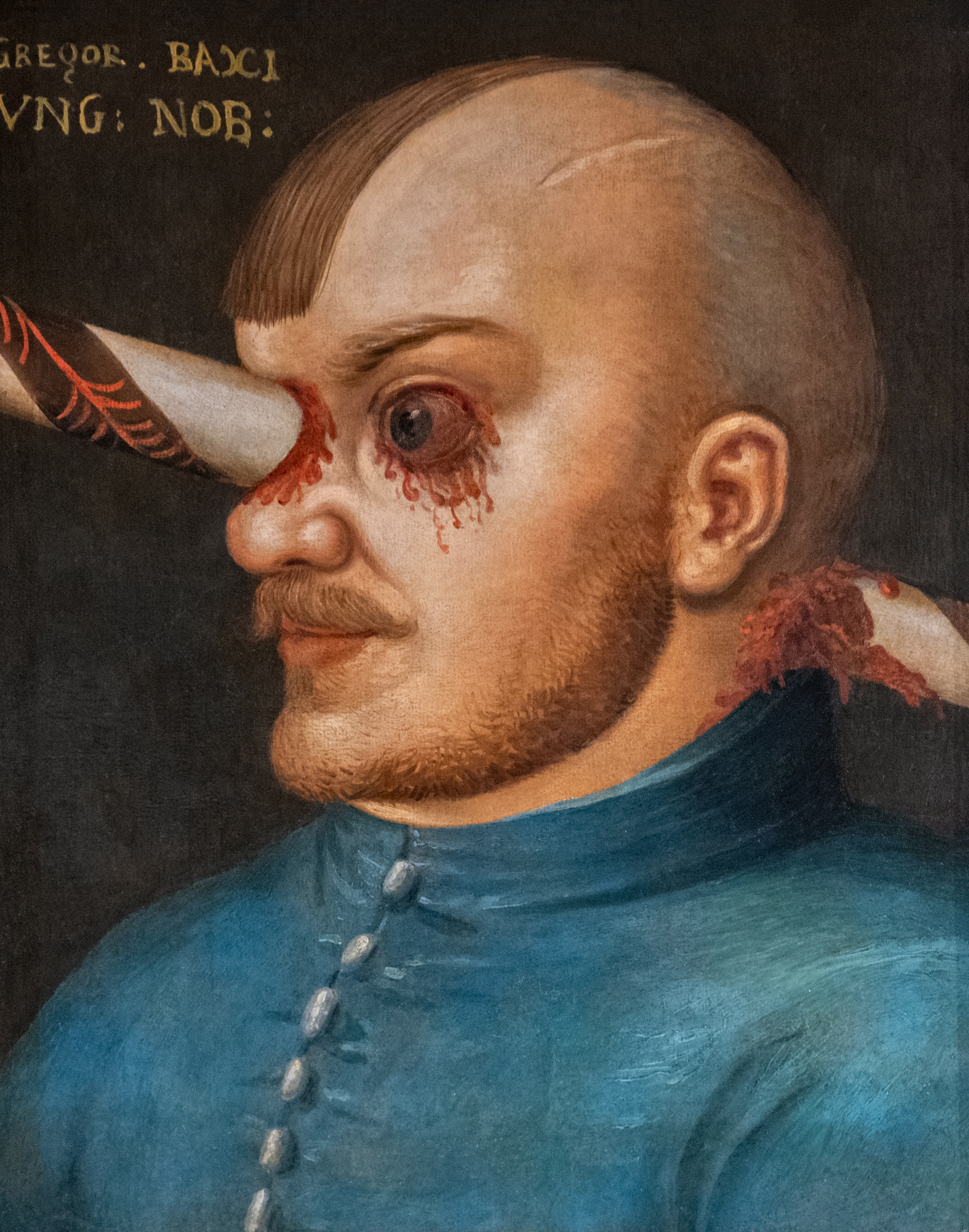
Portrait of Gregor Baci

This portrait represents a Hungarian hussar, by tradition Gregor Baci, who apparently survived a piercing injury with a lance to the right side of his face. The injury may have occurred during a jousting tournament or while fighting the Ottoman Turks. The painting was created by an unknown artist in the 16th century and first listed in 1621.

==== Vlad Ţepeş ====
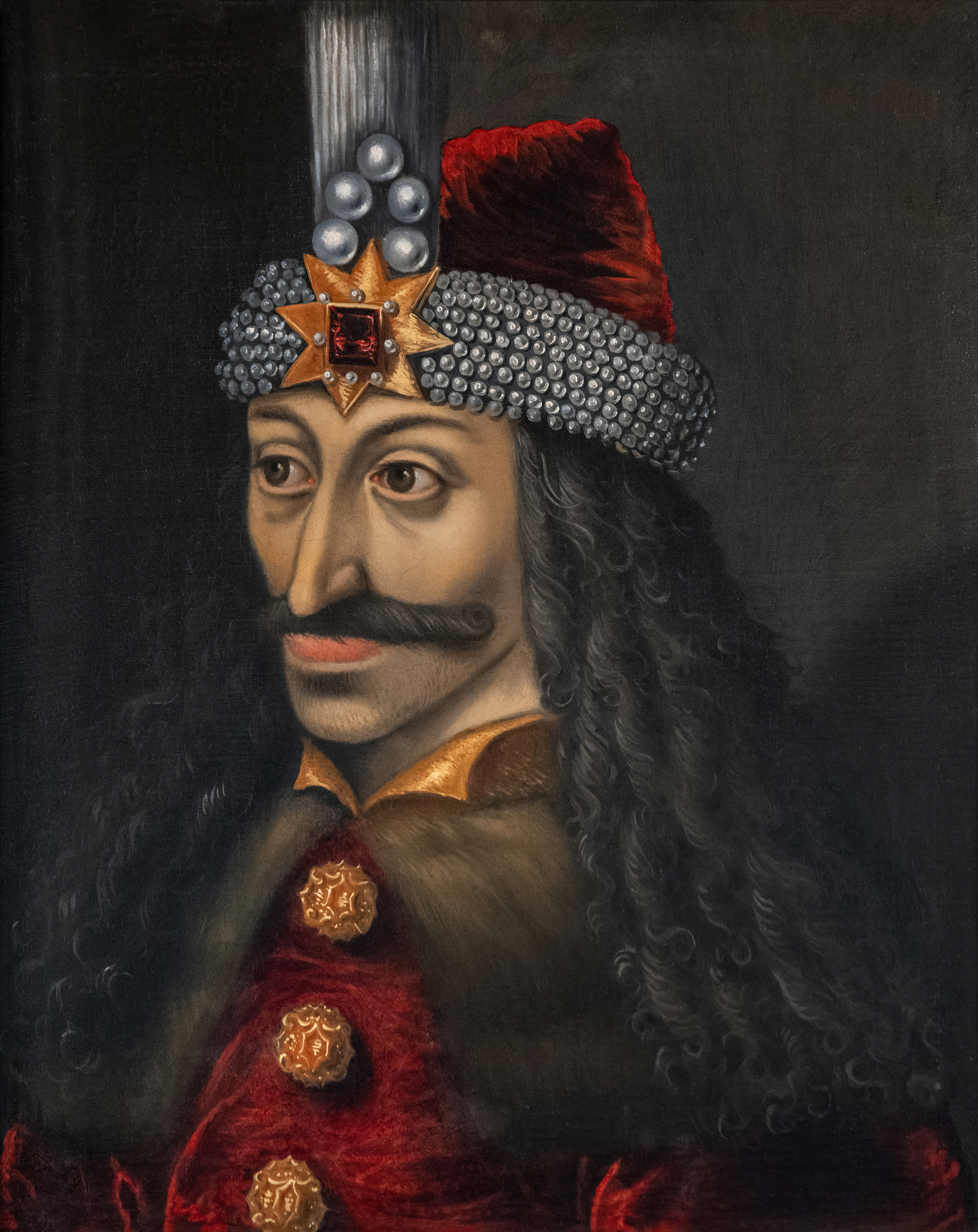
Portrait of Vlad Ţepeş, better known as "Dracula"

Vlad III the Impaler's depiction was painted about one century after his reign and represents one of his earliest portraits. It is intended not only to show him as a ruler but also to be a "psychogram of evil".

==== A man with disabilities ====
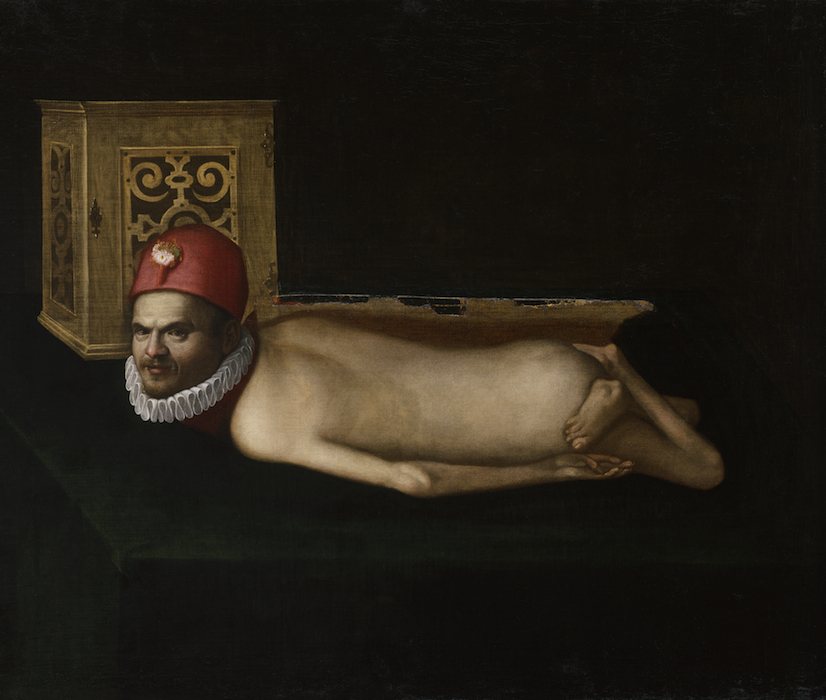
A Man with Disabilities

This painting is considered unusual and unique for the late 16th-century because it depicts man with a physical disability. In typical portrait-style he gazes at the viewer, while the top of his head is covered by a hat. A fashionable neck piece separates his head from his naked body, which lies chest-down on a dark green sheet. His limbs appear withered and useless. Originally the portrait was partially obscured by a sheet of red paper, which the observer would lift to reveal the subject's body. Observers indicated that they were shocked. The man was probably a jester at a court. An extensive analysis of the painting has been published (see external links).

==== Petrus Gonsalvus ====
The collection has a painting of Petrus Gonsalvus and his family, as well as other people who display an extreme form of hirsutism, also called Ambras syndrome in 1933 in reference to its depiction at this collection. The life of Pedro Gonzalez has been well chronicled as he became famous during his lifetime on account of his condition. Born in 1537 in Tenerife, he first came to the court of Henry II, King of France, who sent him to the court of Margaret of Parma, regent of the Netherlands. He was married there and some of his children were also affected by hypertrichosis universalis and painted. His family became an object of medical inquiry by Ulisse Aldrovandi among others. Gonzalez eventually settled in Italy. The paintings of Gonsalvus by an anonymous German artist were likely created from drawings, rather than a live sitting. The paintings were titled "Der Rauch man Zu Münichen" (the "Wild/Hairy Man from Munich" for an old Middle High German Word rûch meaning wild/hairy) because of the origin of the painting, not because Gonsalvus spent any time in Munich.

== Gallery ==
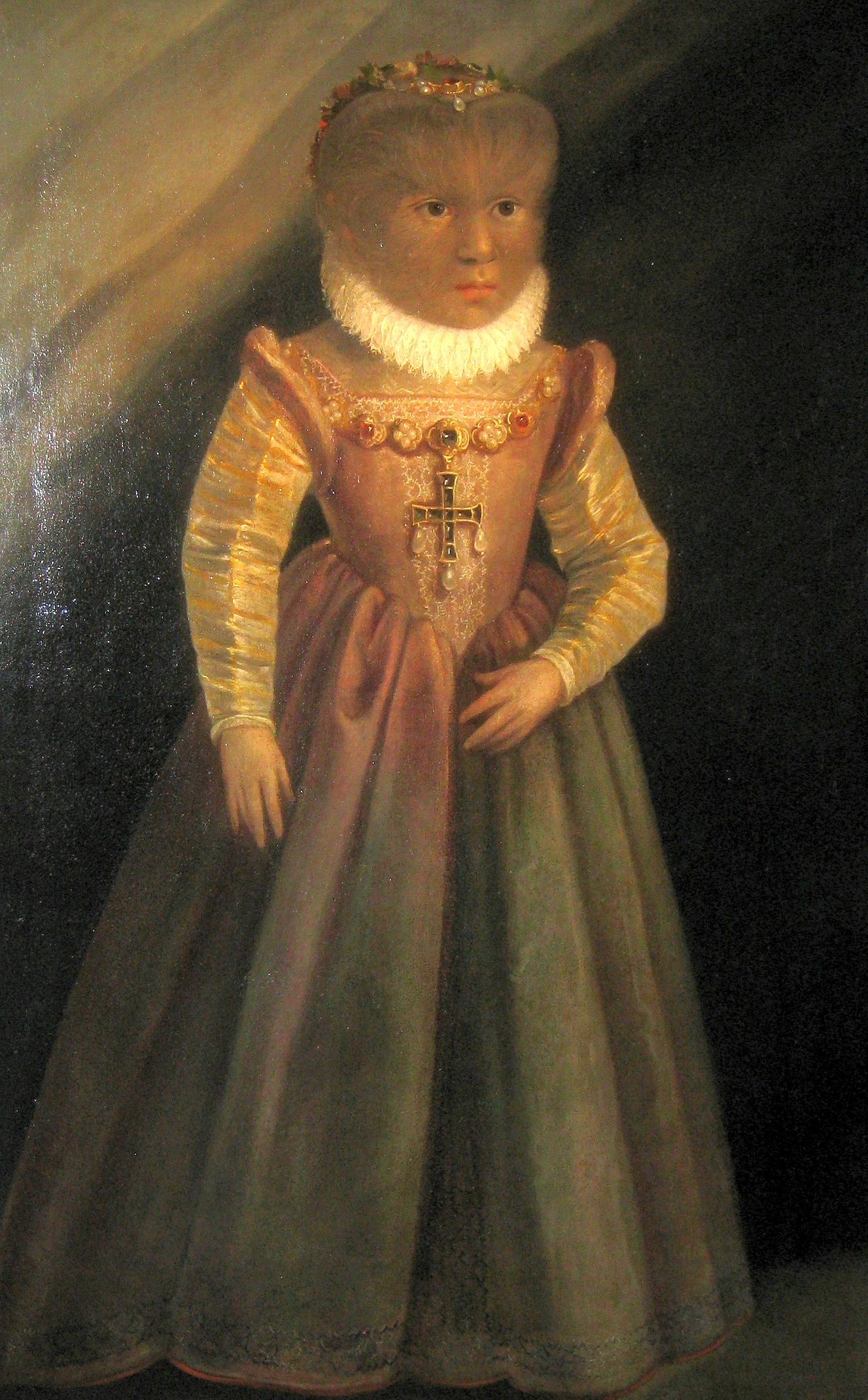
Madelene Gonsalvas portrait 1580 Ambras collection

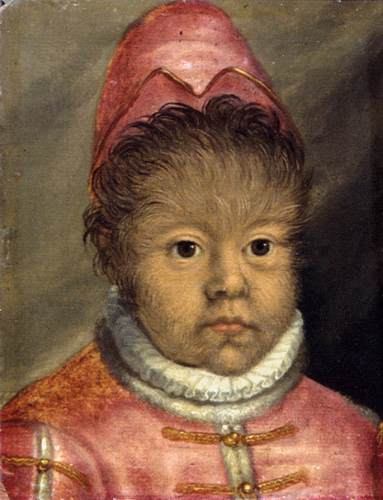
Henry Gonsalvas [Ambras Collection]

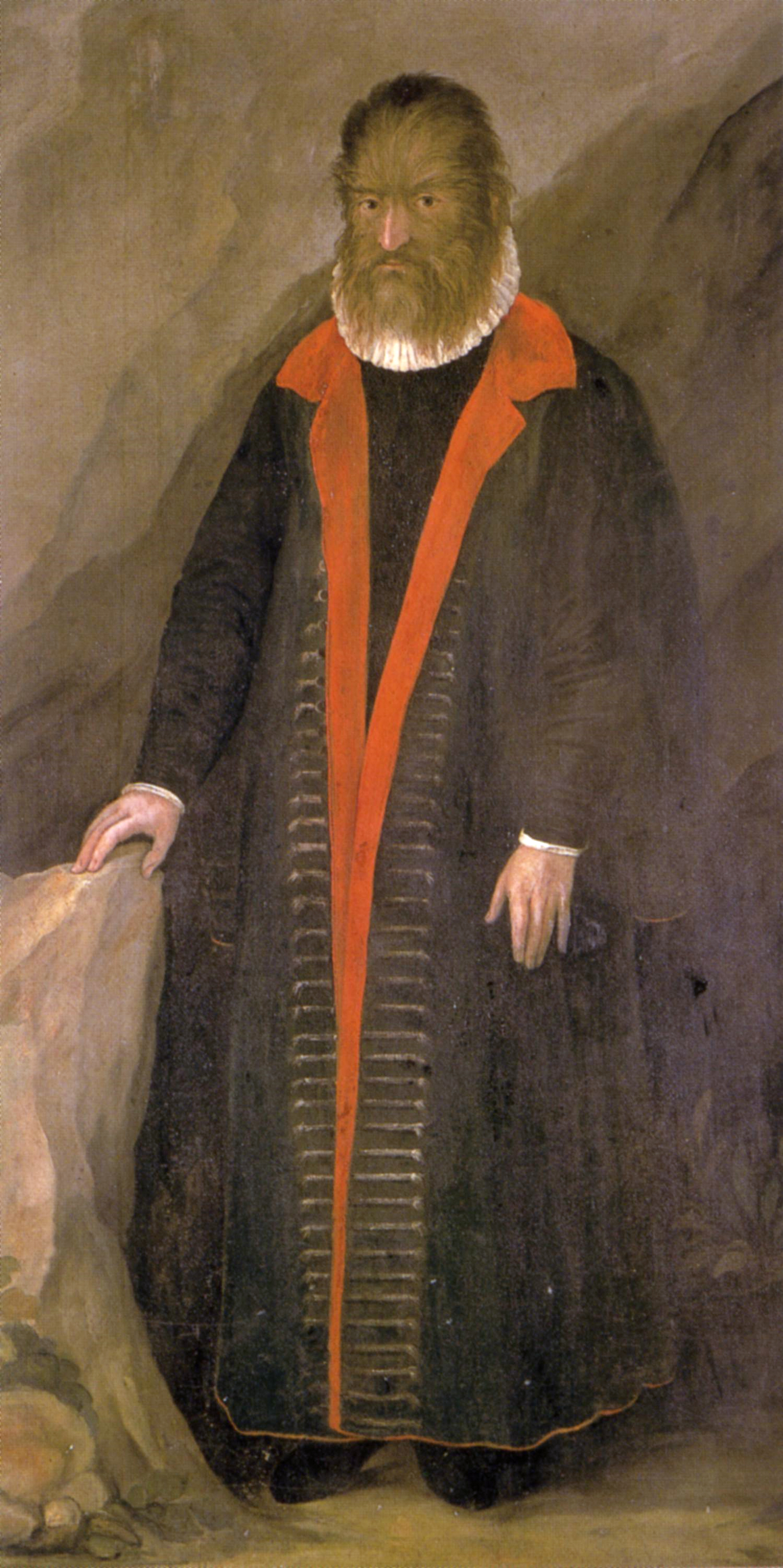
Pedro González [Ambras Collection]

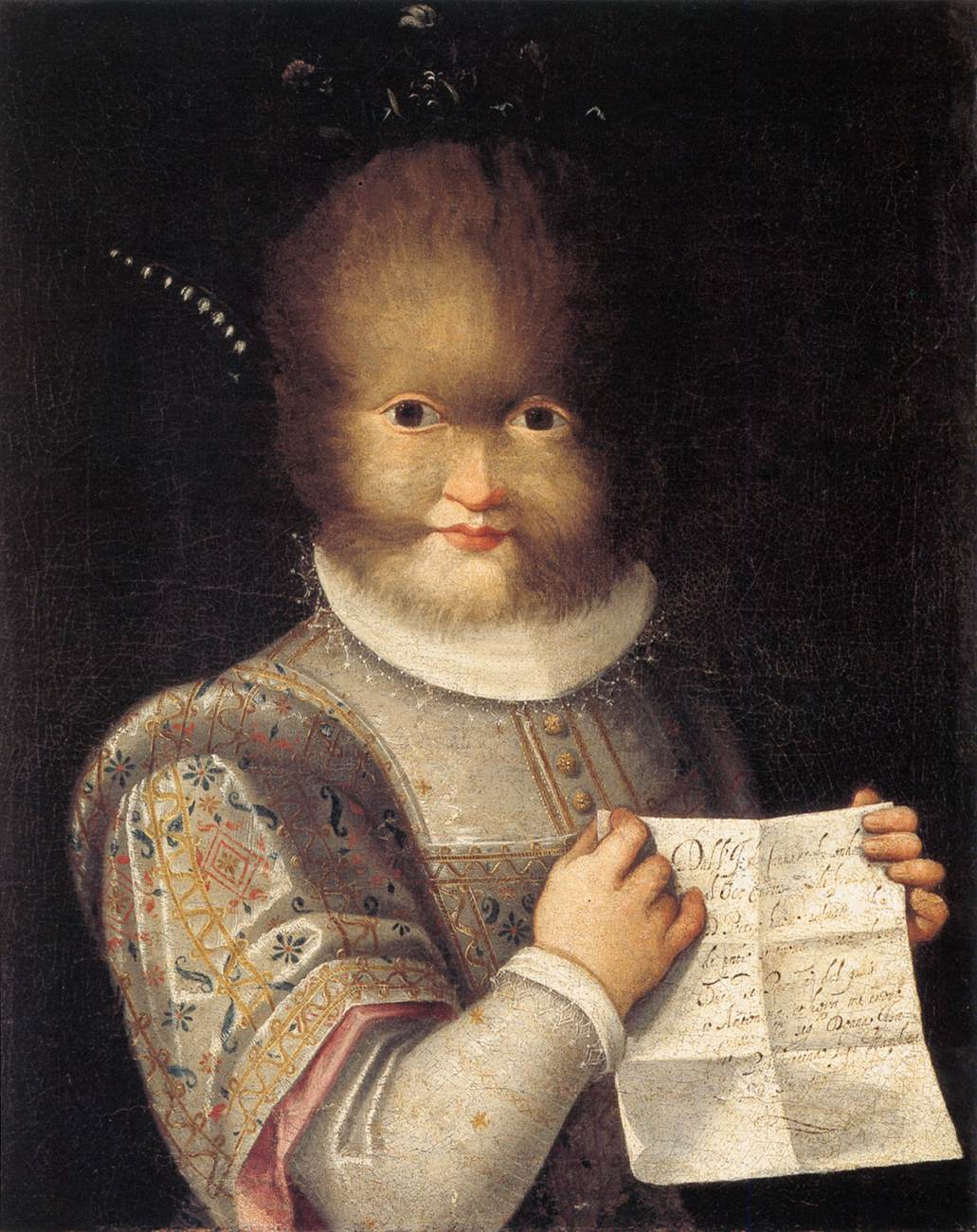
Portrait of Antonietta Gonsalvus by Lavinia Fontana, 1583

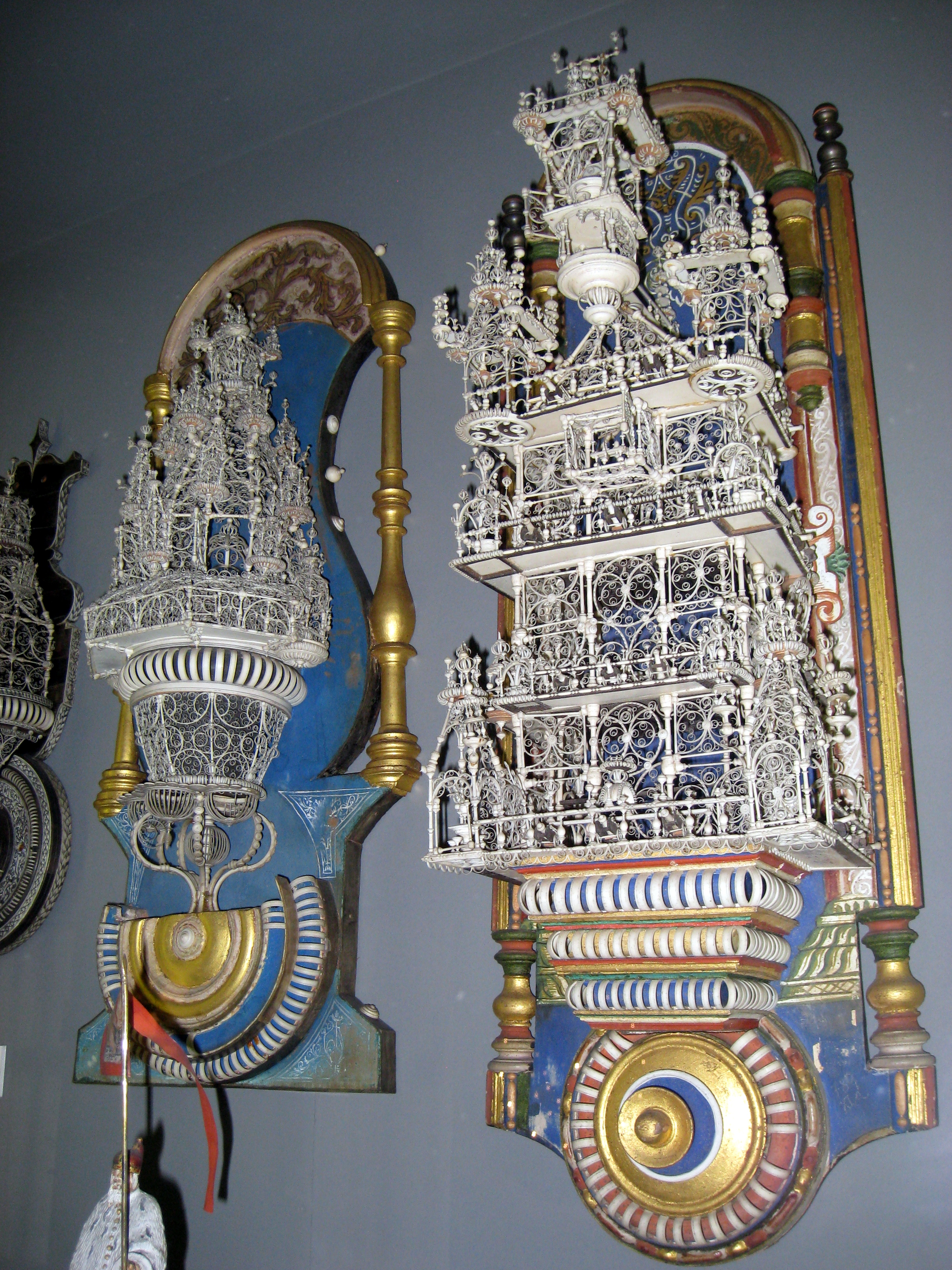
Items carved in ivory
