= Portrait of Antonietta Gonzales =

1595 portrait by Lavinia Fontana

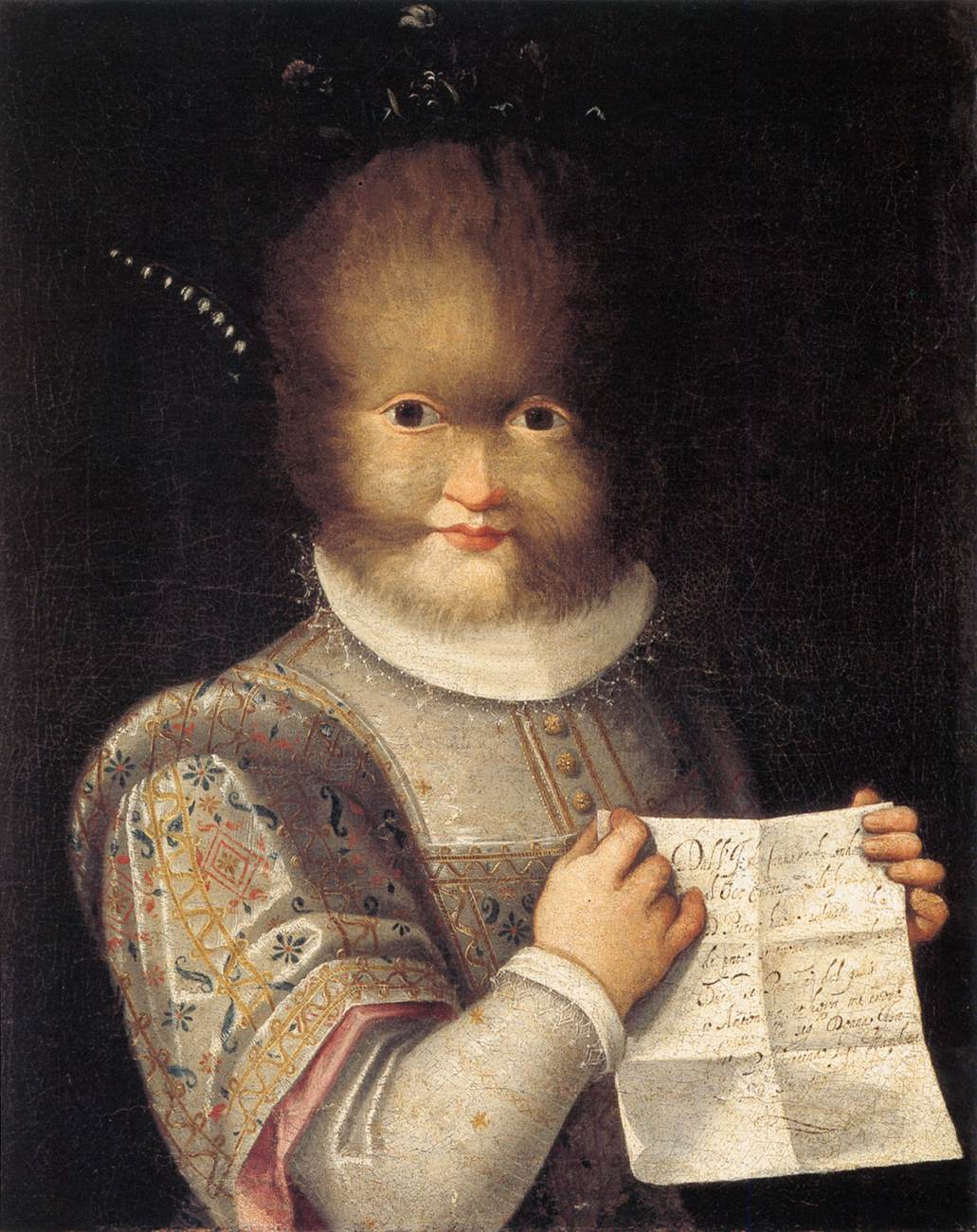
- Artist: Lavinia Fontana
- Year: 1595
- Medium: oil on canvas
- Dimensions: 57 cm × 46 cm (22 in × 18 in)
- Location: Château of Blois, Blois

The Portrait of Antonietta Gonzales is a portrait by one of the most important Italian Renaissance women artists, Lavinia Fontana. The portrait is oil on canvas and depicts a girl with hypertrichosis named Antonietta Gonsalvus (also known as Tognina Gonsalvus), daughter of Petrus Gonsalvus. Antonietta is dressed in finery to show her noble status, but as someone who would have been ostracized because of her unusual appearance, she would have been seen as more animal than human and would not have had the same freedoms as other courtiers.

Until 1990 the painting was credited as the work of a follower of Veronese. It was attributed to Lavinia Fontana due to her connection to the philosopher Ulisse Aldrovandi and another sketch she had drawn of a girl with hypertrichosis. The painting is now in the collection of the Château of Blois.

== Visual description ==
The portrait depicts Antonietta Gonzales (nicknamed Tognina) from the front, her face covered in brown hair due to her hypertrichosis. She is posed like any other portrait of a noble girl would have been despite her condition. Antonietta is dressed in a fine courtly dress decorated with gold, red, and blue embroidered designs and lined with a row of three golden buttons down her front. She is wearing a high collar with lace details that match the lace on the cuffs of her sleeves. Her countenance conveys a small smile and bright eyes in order to convey her humanity rather than focus on her otherness. This individuality regardless of difference was common in Fontana’s paintings. Clutched between her hands is a letter, which indicates the girl's literacy. The letter, which establishes her noble birth but does not explicitly title her a courtier, is positioned so that the viewer may read the biographical information written down:

"Don Pietro, a wild man discovered in the Canary Islands, was conveyed to his most Serene highness Henry, the King of France, and from there came to his Excellency the Duke of Parma. From whom came I, Antoinetta, and now I can be found nearby at the court of the Lady Isabella Pallavincina, the honorable marchesa of Soragna.”

Adorning Antonietta's hair are two sets of flowers. The first, resting behind her right ear, is a Lily of the Valley, which symbolized positive traits such as elegance and humility. Additionally, its white color symbolized purity and its downward facing position symbolized humility. However, it also symbolized the more negative characteristics people with hypertrichosis would have been viewed as, such as having a wild and primitive nature, as the flower could grow in the wild without human care. The second set of flowers that compose the crown on her head are snowdrops, clover, and a carnation. This flower crown is meant to be seen as civil and elegant but each of the flowers chosen in the portrait are all flowers that grow commonly in the wild. This depiction further emphasizes the child's dual nature of civil and wild.

== Biography ==
Antonietta appealed to the Renaissance fascination with the monstrous, and the philosopher Ulisse Aldrovandi published a study of Antonietta in 1642 in his History of Monsters, as in the sixteenth and seventeenth century the word monstrous was used to describe those with physical defects.

Several of the Gonzales family had the hypertrichosis condition, including her father and her two sisters. The family was the most painted hypertrichosis family in Europe. Because of her hypertrichosis the portrait would have been viewed as an object to display rather than a piece of artwork. Because her condition made her physical appearance different from others, Antonietta would have been viewed more as an animal than a person and was given as a gift to Isabella Pallavicina.

Throughout their lives the family had been studied, their likeness being recorded by artists using a variety of mediums, including woodcut and engraving. Lavinia Fontana had produced a pencil sketch of a girl with hypertrichosis, which could have been a rough draft of Antonietta or a sketch of her sister Francesca. The nature of the family was discussed by artists, physicians, and scientists of the time who saw their portraits, such as this one, and contemplated their existence, debating in the role of the divine and the balance between nature and nurture. No historical records have been left behind by any of the Gonzales sisters, so their opinions regarding their hairiness are unknown. The only surviving sources from the family is from letters written by one of Antonietta's brothers and does not mention the hypertrichosis conditions of his family members.

Antonietta and her two sisters never held an official position at court, unlike her father and brother, who held minor positions in the royal and noble courts they lived in over the course of their lives. Antonietta and her sisters did not receive a salary during their time at court. Scant details are known about Maddalena Gonzales and Francesca Gonzales, but nothing is known about Antonietta's life, so it may be that Antonietta died young. However, it is entirely possible that she disappeared from history because she did not pass on the phenotype responsible for hypertrichosis and had children unaffected by the condition, rendering them historically insignificant.

=== Role at Court ===
People with hypertrichosis appeared to perpetuate the "wild man" myth and therefore were desired at court. The "wild man" myth was a popular belief in medieval Europe, where it was believed there was a race of beastly and savage men covered in hair that lived throughout the forests of Europe, Africa, and Asia. "Monstrous" people such as those with hypertrichosis or conjoined twins were rarer than court dwarves and giants, which added to their desirability.

Unlike other courtiers, the lowborn status of the Gonzales family would not have made them a threat to the elite, and because they were likened to animals, the court would have viewed them as too uncivilized to be considered human. That being said, her father, Petrus Gonzalvus, was given the title of Don three years before Antoinetta's birth.

Joris Hoefnagel included his portraits of the Gonzales family in his Animalia Rationalia et Insecta, making them the only humans to be featured in four volumes of zoological drawings. Additionally, the painting depicting the family's arrival at the court in Vienna was kept in the Holy Roman Emperor Rudolf II's folder of zoological drawings.

Majority of paintings of people with hypertrichosis were collected in cabinets of curiosities, making their portraits objects meant for display rather than artistic works to be displayed in portrait galleries. A 1621 inventory specifically mentions the portraits of the Gonzales family were hung in adjacent to "Indian" items from the New World, furthering their status as objects to be owned and curiosities of the New World to be marveled at.

Despite being seen as objects to display, there is evidence of people with hypertrichosis being respected as courtiers. Petrus' intellect impressed King Henri II and he was given an education befitting any other noble boy, including learning Latin. Unlike dwarves, the family's education aligned them closer to other courtiers than the other "court monsters." Antonietta's different appearance made her collectable, but it provided her an education and the safety of a courtier's life. This is apparent in Fontana's depiction of Antonietta, which referenced the cultural beliefs about people with hypertrichosis and combined them with the family's complex personal history.
