= Petrus Gonsalvus =

16th century man known for hypertrichosis

Don Pedro González
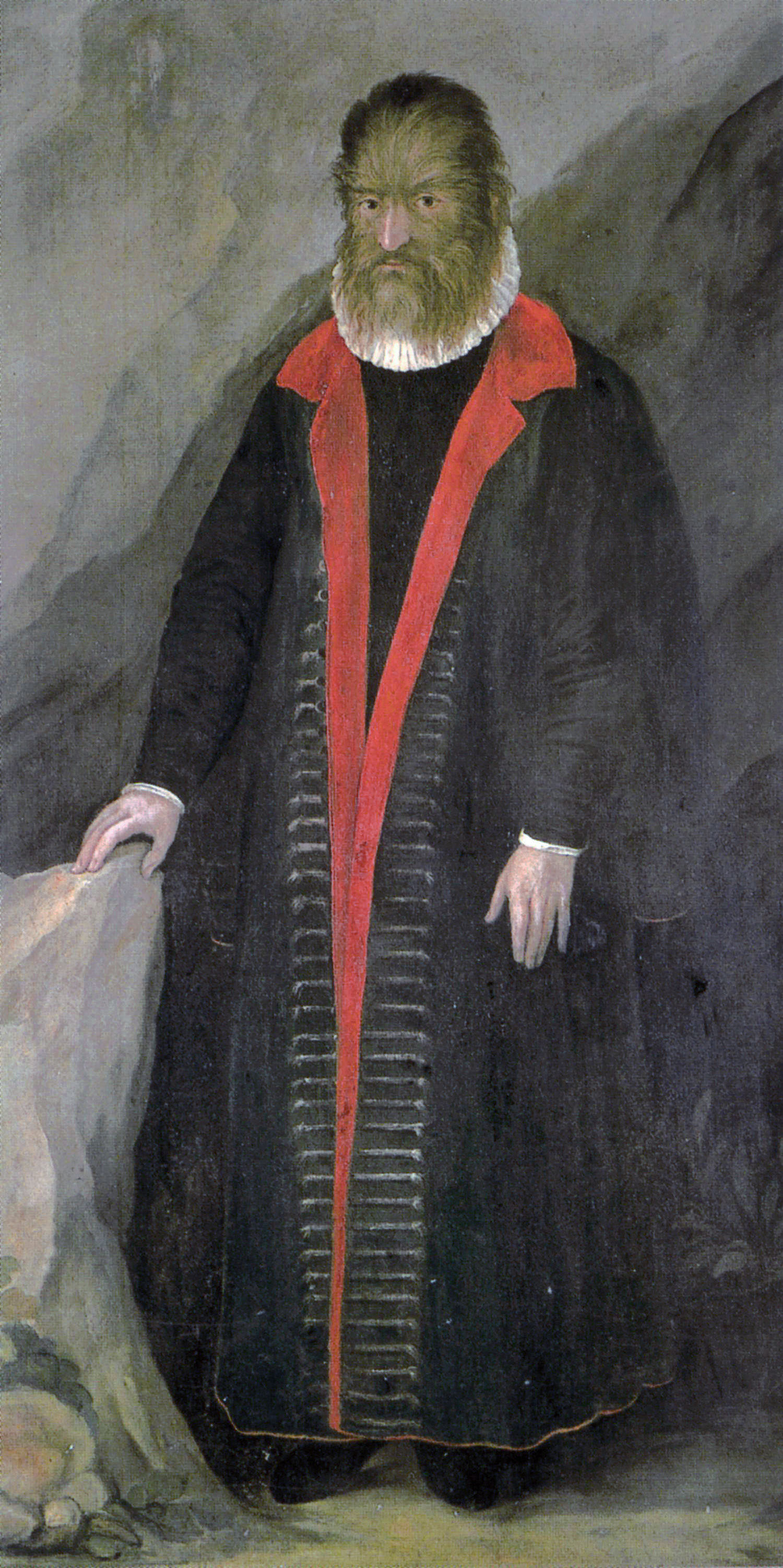
- Pedro González, painting c. 1580 (Ambras Collection)
- Born: Pedro González; May 9, 1537; Tenerife, Crown of Castile, Spanish Empire
- Died: October 15, 1618 (aged 81); Capodimonte
- Occupation: Courtier
- Years active: 1547–1618
- Spouse: Catherine Raffelin (m. 1573)
- Children: Madeleine; Enrique; Françoise; Antonietta; Horacio; Ercole

Petrus Gonsalvus (Spanish: Pedro González; (9 May 1537, Tenerife – 15 October 1618), Capodimonte) was a gentleman in the court of Henry II of France.

Referred to by Ulisse Aldrovandi as "the man of the woods", he was notable for his unusual hairiness, which attracted attention throughout his life (and beyond, especially as most of his children inherited his condition). This interest came both from doctors — being considered the first definitely recorded case of hypertrichosis (at least in Europe) — as well as from society at large (including high society, where he spent much time), with him acquiring such nicknames as the "wild gentleman of Tenerife" (Spanish: salvaje gentilhombre de Tenerife) and the "Canarian werewolf" (hombre lobo canario). His life at various courts in France and Italy has been well chronicled.

== Biography ==
Gonsalvus was born on May 9, 1537 in Tenerife, shortly after the conquest of the island by Alonso Fernández de Lugo. Of Guanche heritage, he was deemed worthy of the Don honorific later in his life on account of his supposed parental descent from the menceys of Tenerife.

Gonsalvus first came to the court of Henry II, King of France in 1547 at the age of around 10, and was sent there as a gift from the court of Margaret of Parma, regent of the Netherlands. He married while there; the name of his wife remains unknown, but it is believed she was named Catherine Raffelin and that she may have been a lady-in-waiting to Catherine de' Medici. Later, he was moved into the court of Alexander Farnese, Duke of Parma. Of his six children, only two — Françoise and Enrico — did not have hypertrichosis. The ones who did — such as Antonietta Gonsalvus — were also the subject of attention, including paintings. His family became an object of medical inquiry by Ulisse Aldrovandi among others. Despite living and acting as nobles, Gonsalvus and his hairy children were not considered fully human in the eyes of their contemporaries and were gifted, like their father was, to other nobles as a sort of court pet. Gonsalvus eventually settled in Italy with his wife.

He was listed among those who had attended his grandson's christening in 1617. He died on October 15, 1618 in Capodimonte. He was 81 years old.

== Chamber of Art and Curiosities, Ambras Castle ==
The Chamber of Art and Curiosities, Ambras Castle collection in Innsbruck, Austria has a painting of Pedro González (Petrus Gonsalvus) as well as other people who display an extreme form of hirsutism, also called Ambras syndrome or hypertrichosis in 1933 in reference to its depiction at this collection.

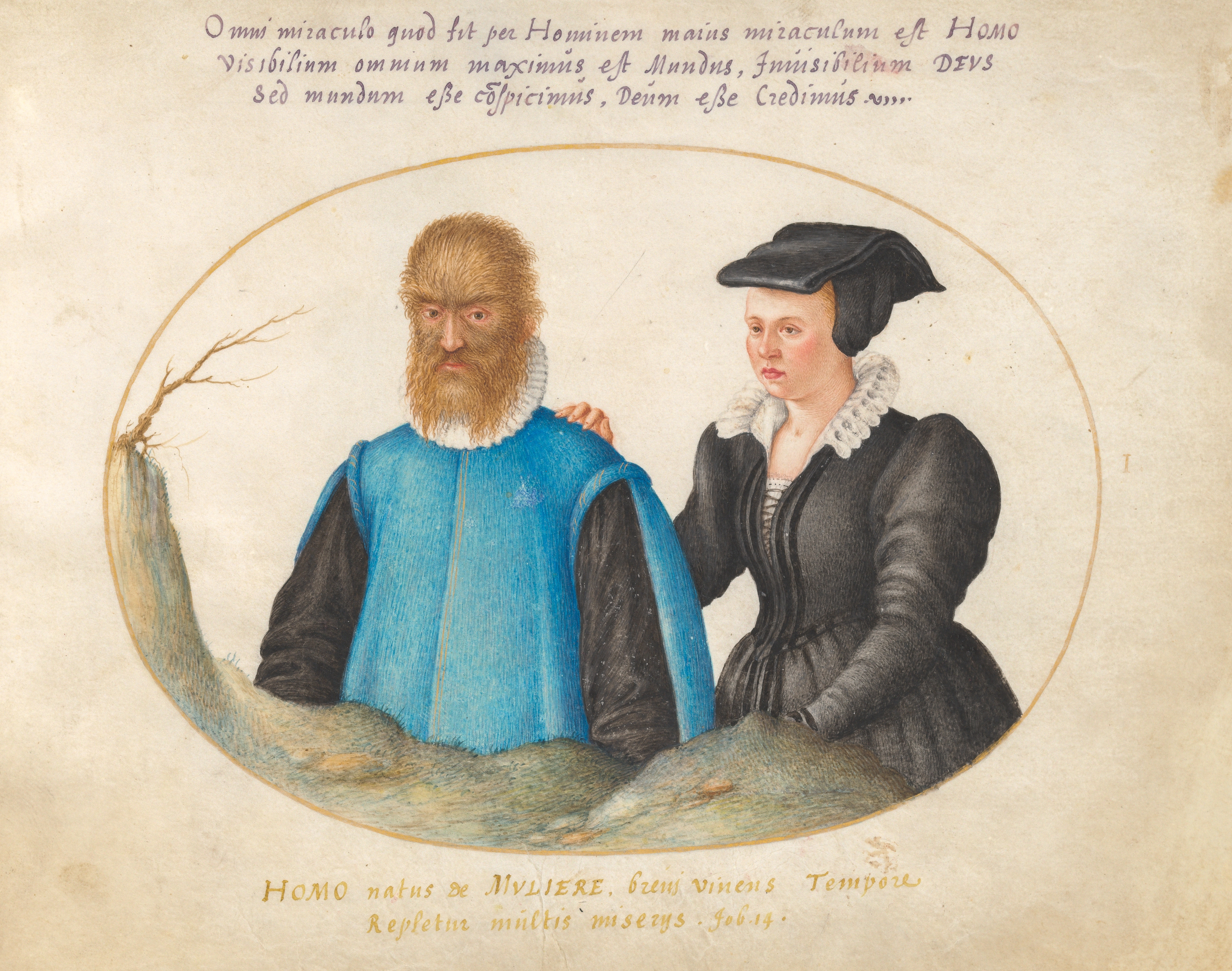
Petrus Gonsalvus and his wife Catherine by Joris Hoefnagel

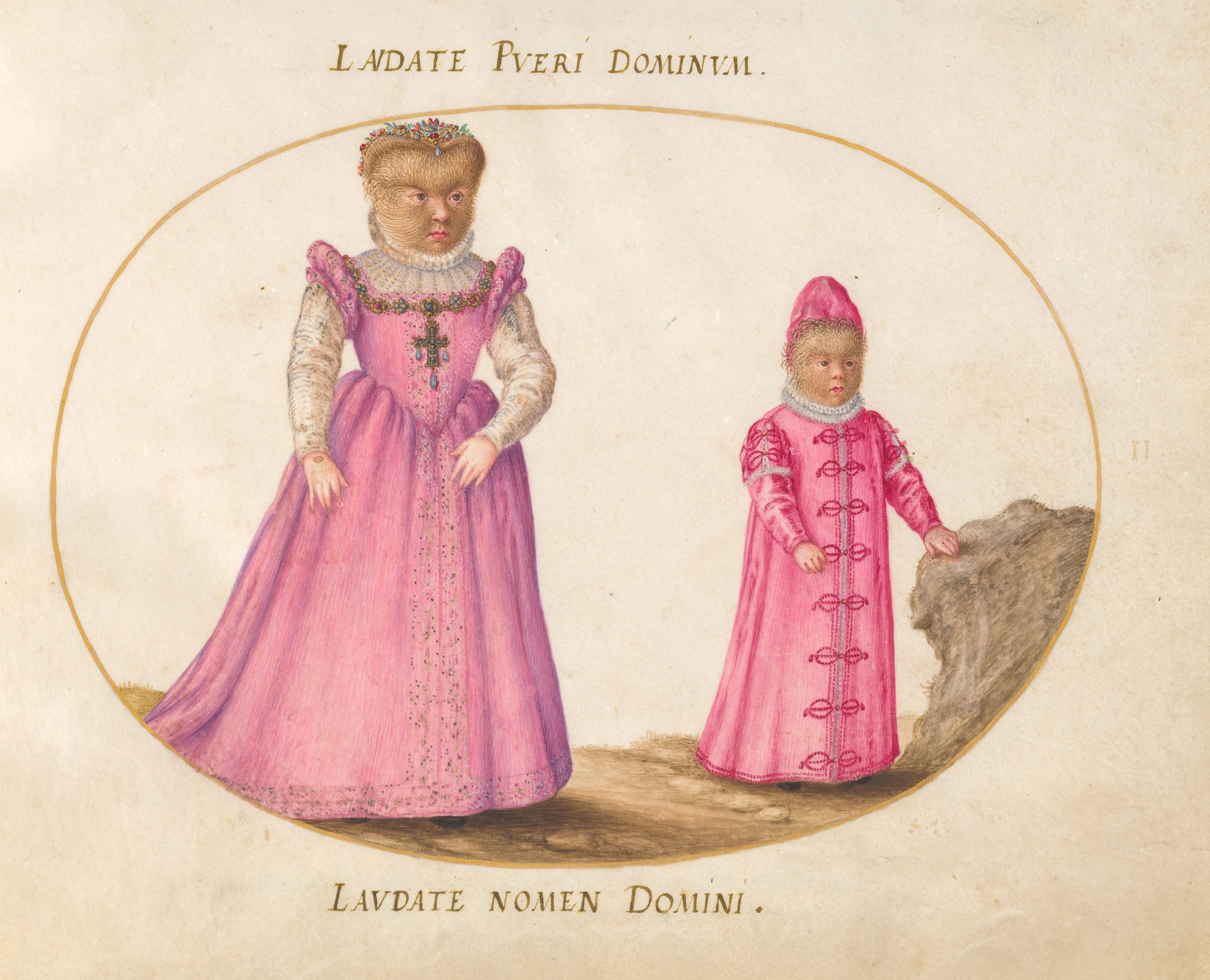
Children of Petrus Gonsalvus by Joris Hoefnagel

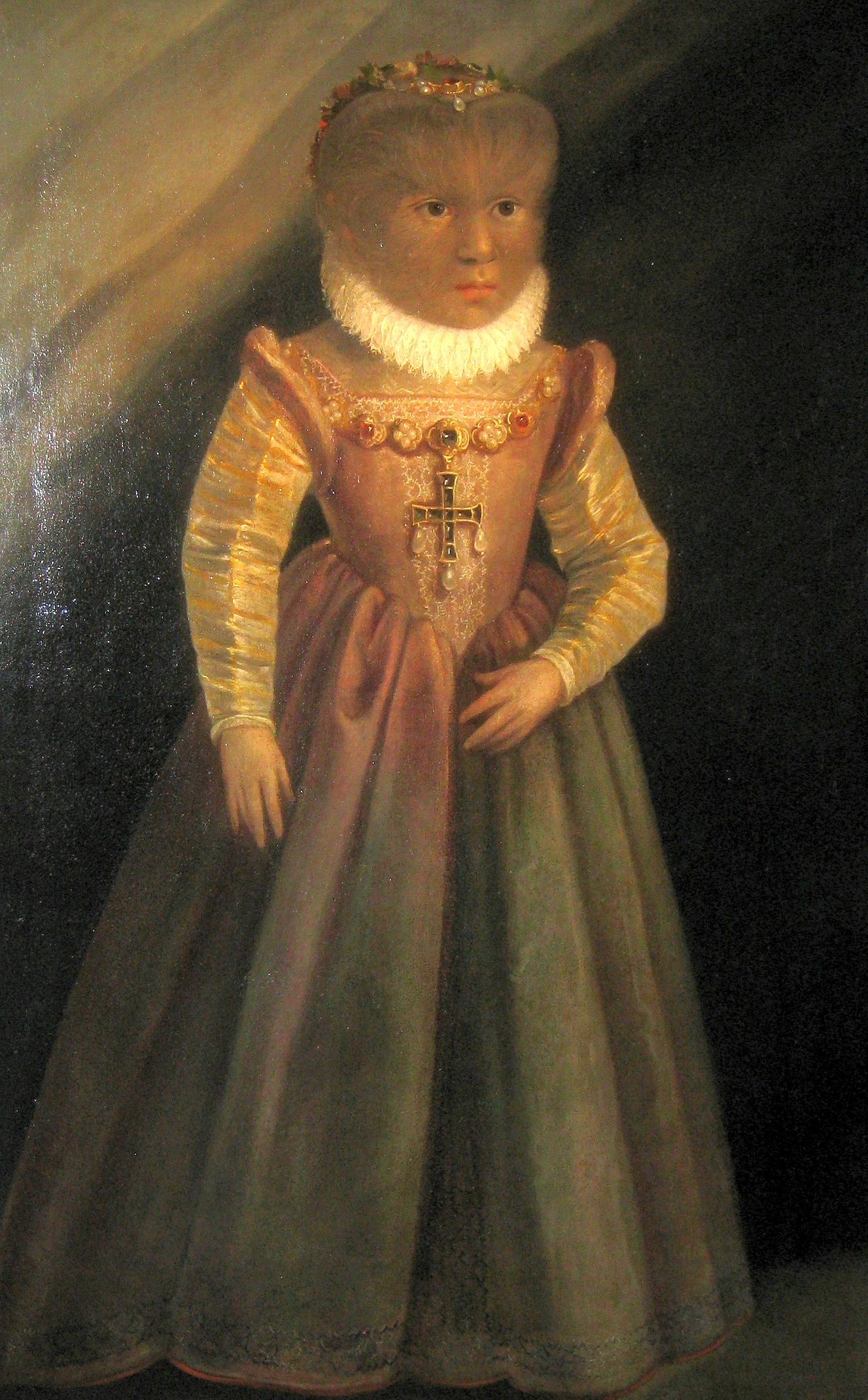
Madelene Gonsalvas portrait, 1580, Ambras collection

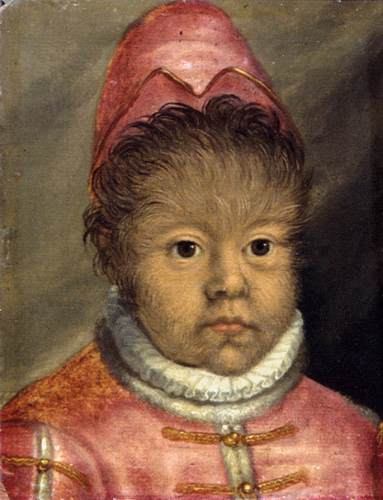
Henry Gonsalvas, Ambras Collection

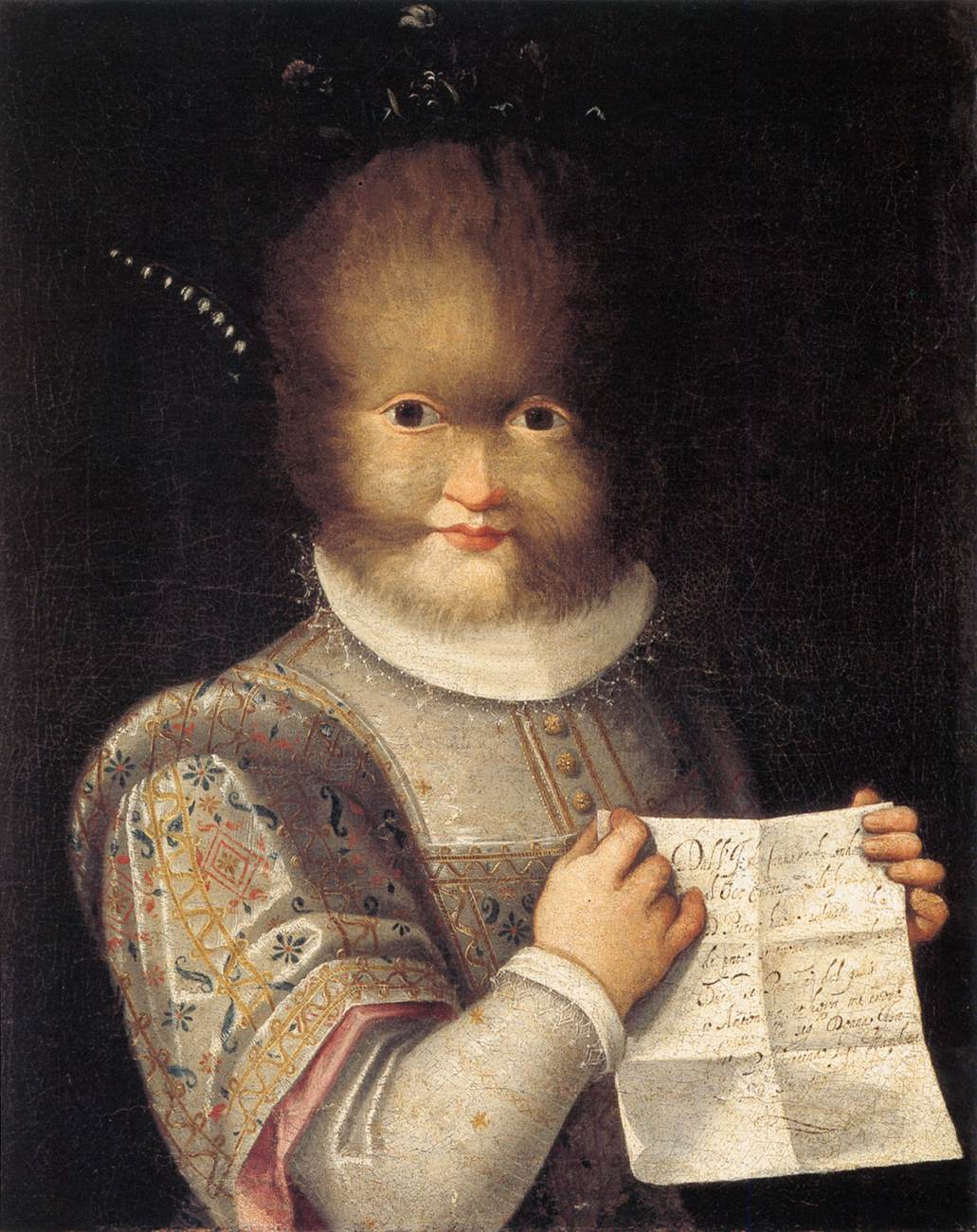
Portrait of Antonietta Gonzales by Lavinia Fontana, 1595.

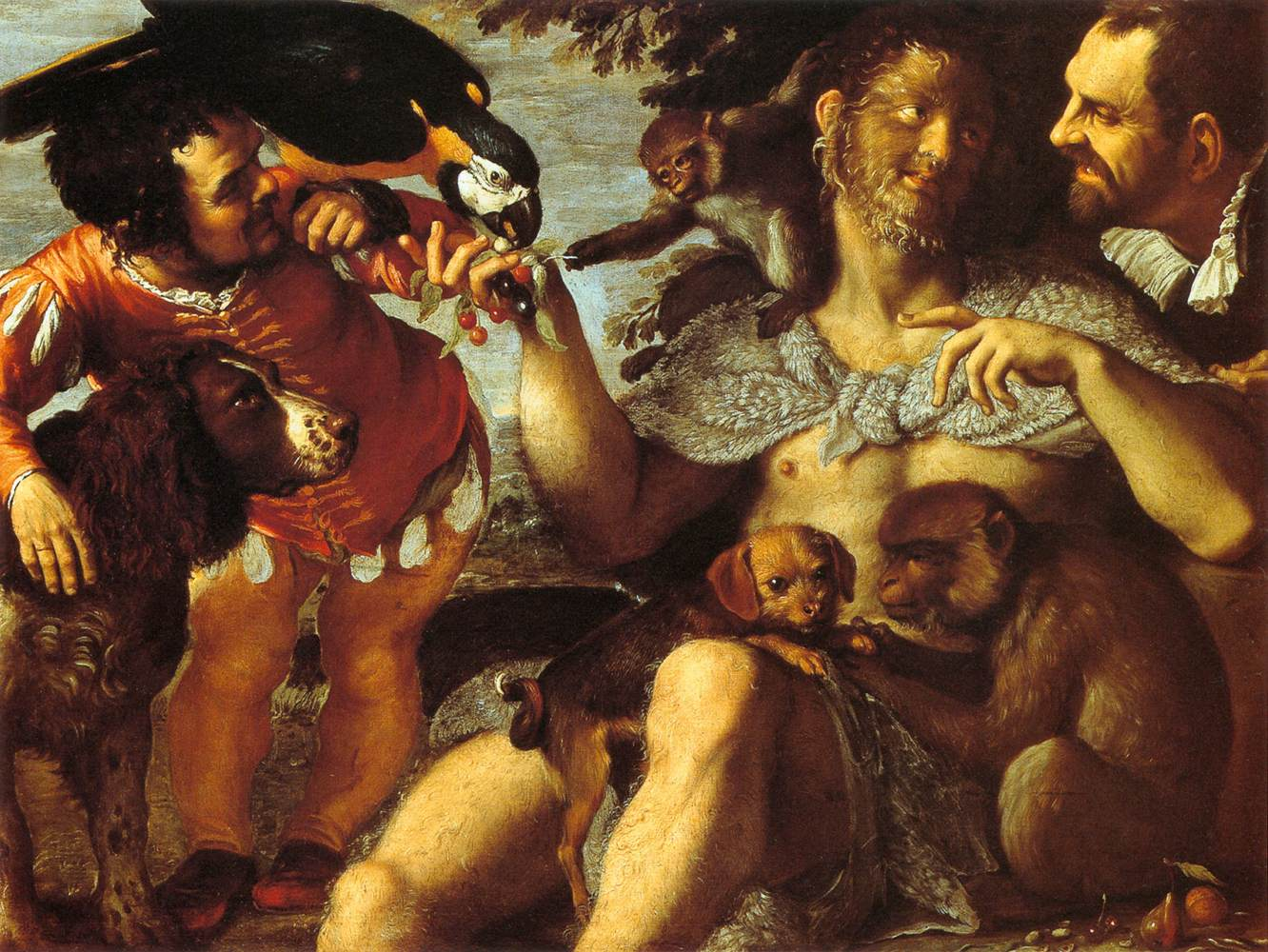
Agostino Carracci. Hairy Harry, Mad Peter and Tiny Amon. 1598. Capodimonte

== Legacy ==
1975 Devil Doubloon (Mardi Gras token) of Petrus Gonsalvus, dubbed a "wolfman".

It is believed the marriage between Petrus Gonsalvus and Lady Catherine may have partially inspired the fairy tale Beauty and the Beast.
