= Portrait of Gregor Baci =

16th-century painting of a nobleman with a lance traversing his head

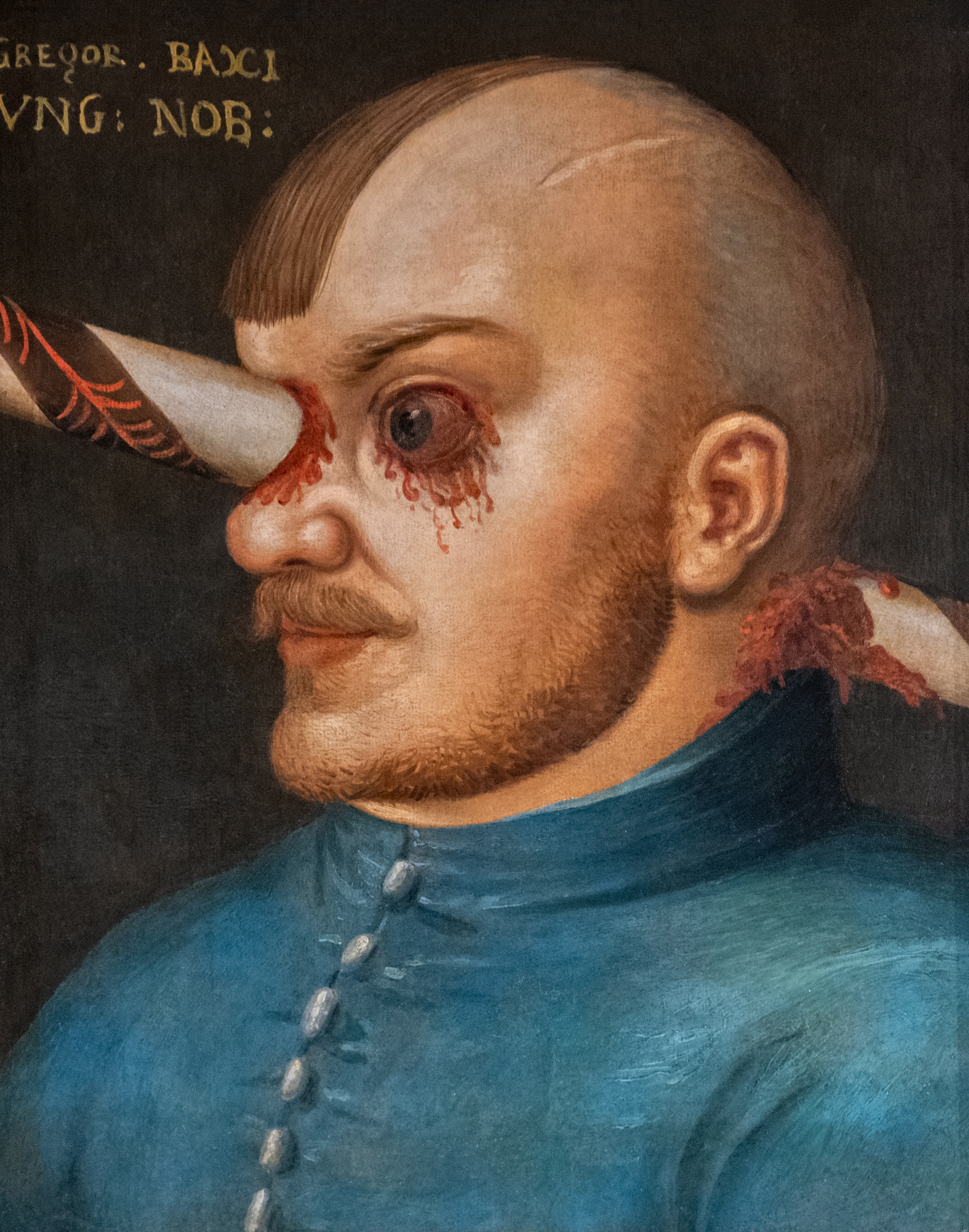
- Artist: Unknown Austrian painter
- Year: 16th century
- Type: Oil on canvas
- Dimensions: 31 cm × 39 cm (12 in × 15 in)
- Location: Ambras Castle, Innsbruck

Portrait of Gregor Baci is a 16th-century painting by an unknown Austrian painter. It is housed in Ambras Castle in Innsbruck, Austria. The painting depicts a Hungarian nobleman, Gregor Baci, who survived a lance piercing his right eye socket and exiting through his neck.

== Description ==
The painting depicts the Hungarian nobleman Gregor Baci (Baksa Márk), who survived a lance piercing his right eye socket and exiting through his neck. An inscription in the upper left corner, in Latin, reads: GREGOR. BAXI VNG: NOB: – "Gregor Baxi, Hungarian nobleman." Although the injury is traditionally attributed to a jousting tournament, a 2024 study concluded it was more likely caused by an Ottoman jarid (a type of throwing spear) during the 1598 siege of Győr.

For "therapeutic purposes", the spearhead was sawed off from both ends. According to historical records, the nobleman lived for one year after the wounding.

The painting was first mentioned in the 1621 inventory of Ambras Castle under the title "Hungarian hussar, wounded in combat with the Turks." It most likely entered the collection of Ferdinand II, Archduke of Austria, due to his well-known interest in arms and curiosities. One of the mysteries of the painting is whether such an injury could be survived. The unusual medical detail may have been the main reason the portrait was commissioned. Although similar traumas were not uncommon in the early modern period, the survival of Baci attracted lasting curiosity.

Due to skepticism among museum visitors, the case was studied by radiologists, radiation oncologists, and neurologists at the Medical University of Innsbruck. Using two-dimensional data from the painting, they created a three-dimensional anatomical reconstruction of the skull with rapid prototyping technology. Their findings suggested that Baci could indeed have survived the injury if the lance had passed below the brain.

A comparable case was described in The Lancet in 2010: a craftsman impaled by a metal rod that fell from a church ceiling at a height of 14 metres (46 ft) survived the injury with minimal long-term symptoms five years later.

== See also ==
- Ahad Israfil – known for his recovery from a gunshot injury that destroyed most of his right cerebral hemisphere
- Anatoli Bugorski – scientist whose head was struck by a particle-accelerator proton beam
- Eadweard Muybridge – another early case of head injury leading to mental changes
- Henry V of England – narrowly survived an arrow that penetrated six inches into his skull; treated by John Bradmore
- Lev Zasetsky – soldier who developed agnosia after a bullet pierced his parieto-occipital area
- Phineas Gage – whose head was impaled by a crowbar
