= Antonietta Gonsalvus =

French woman with excessive hair growth

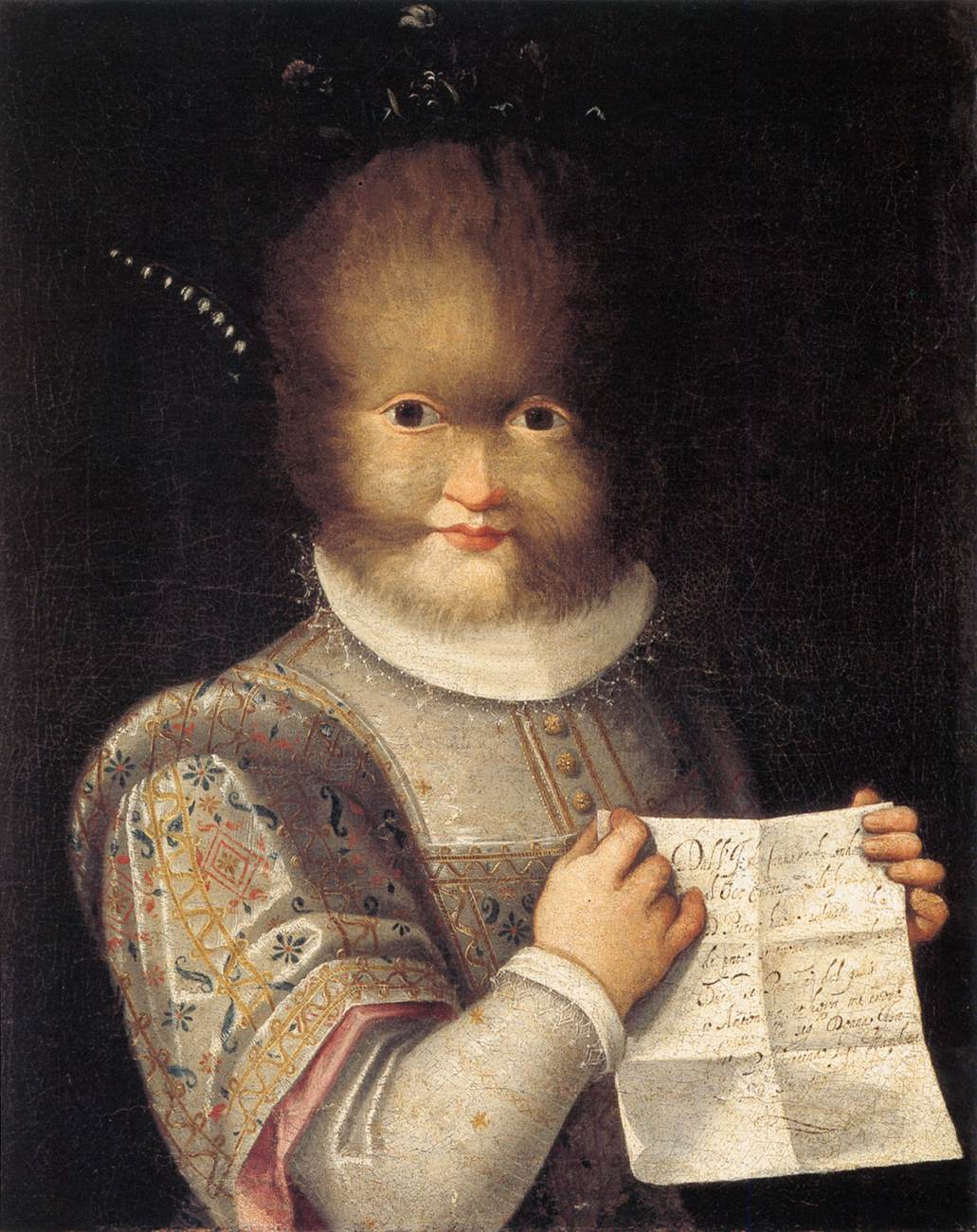
- Portrait of Antonietta Gonsalvus (1593) by Lavinia Fontana
- Born: Antonietta Gonsalvus c. 1580; France
- Died: c. 1655; Italy
- Other name: Tognina
- Occupation: Court personality
- Known for: Hypertrichosis
- Parents: Petrus Gonsalvus (father); Catherine Raffelin (mother)

Antonietta (Tognina) Gonsalvus, also Gonzalves or Conzales (born c. 1580 in France) was a so-called monkey girl. She became famous for having (like her father and three of her five brothers) hypertrichosis (a congenital disease). Her family is considered to be the oldest case of human excessive hair growth described in Europe. Antonietta died c. 1655 in Capodimonte (Viterbo), Italy, where her father also died.

== Life and family ==
Antonietta has been depicted in various paintings and prints both as a little girl and as a young woman and has become known under the name Tognina. She grew up in Fontainebleau and was part of the court of King Henry II of France and his wife, Catherine de Medici. Tognina is mentioned primarily in reports about her family, some of whom like her, suffered from hypertrichosis, also called Ambras syndrome.

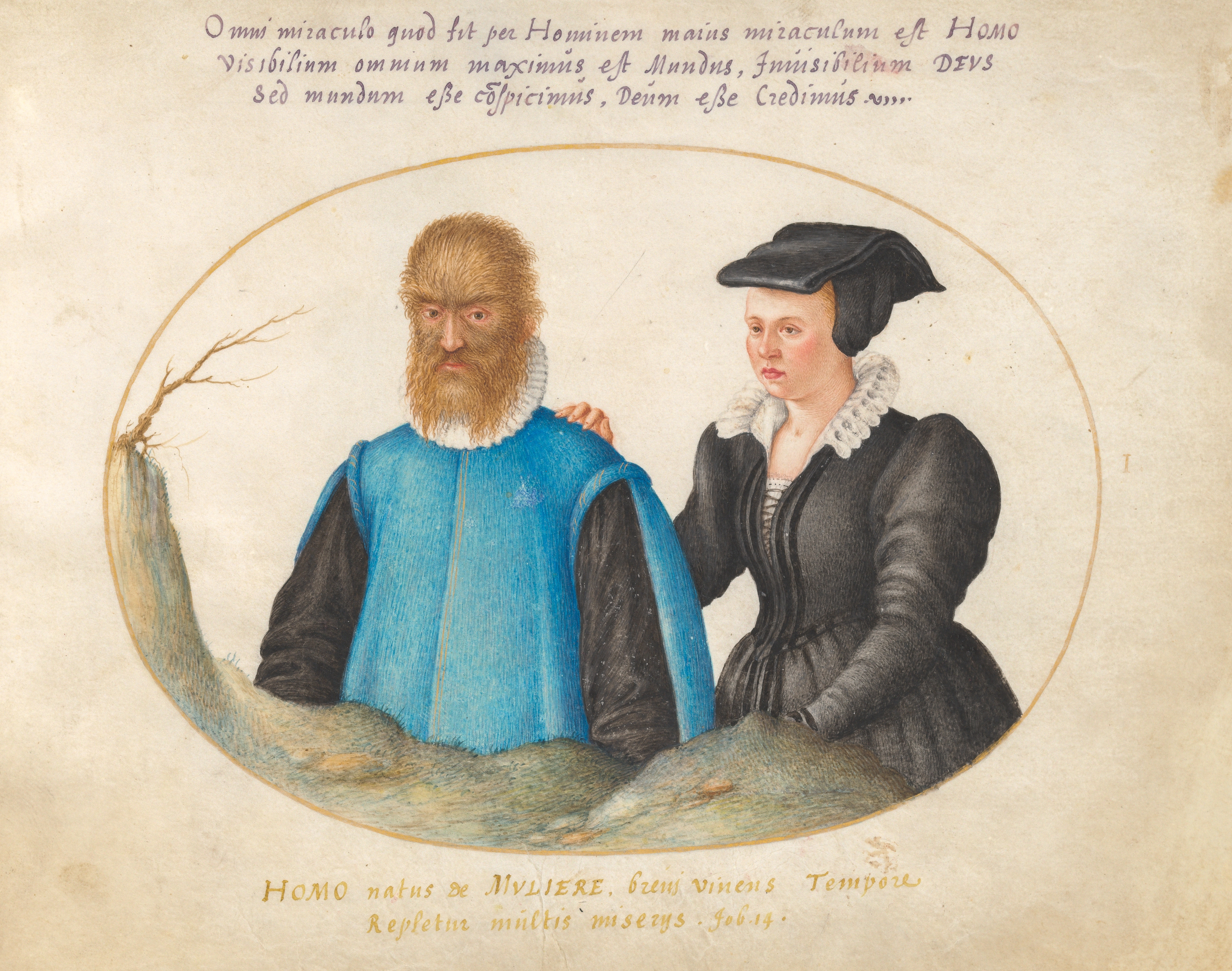
Tognina's parents, Petrus and Catherine, by Hoefnagel. National Gallery of Art Washington

Tognina's father, Petrus Gonsalvus, was born in Tenerife, Canary Islands, in 1556. As a child, he was sent to the court of Henry II where he was initially kept as a monkey and received no attention as a human until he grew up. Petrus, who was eventually educated and learned to speak Latin, married a beautiful woman, Catherine Raffelin from Paris who did not have abnormal body hair.

The couple had several children, some of whom, including Tognina, inherited their father's illness and others who did not. King Henry gave the Gonsalvus family a part of the vast park at his Palace of Fontainebleau to give them a natural environment and protection. Petrus, called the "ape-man," regularly participated in social events, dressed in courtly robes, while little Tognina always dressed like a doll. The Gonsalvus family is known to have traveled to Italy around 1580–1590 as their stay was recorded at the court of Margaret of Parma.

== Scientific inquiries ==
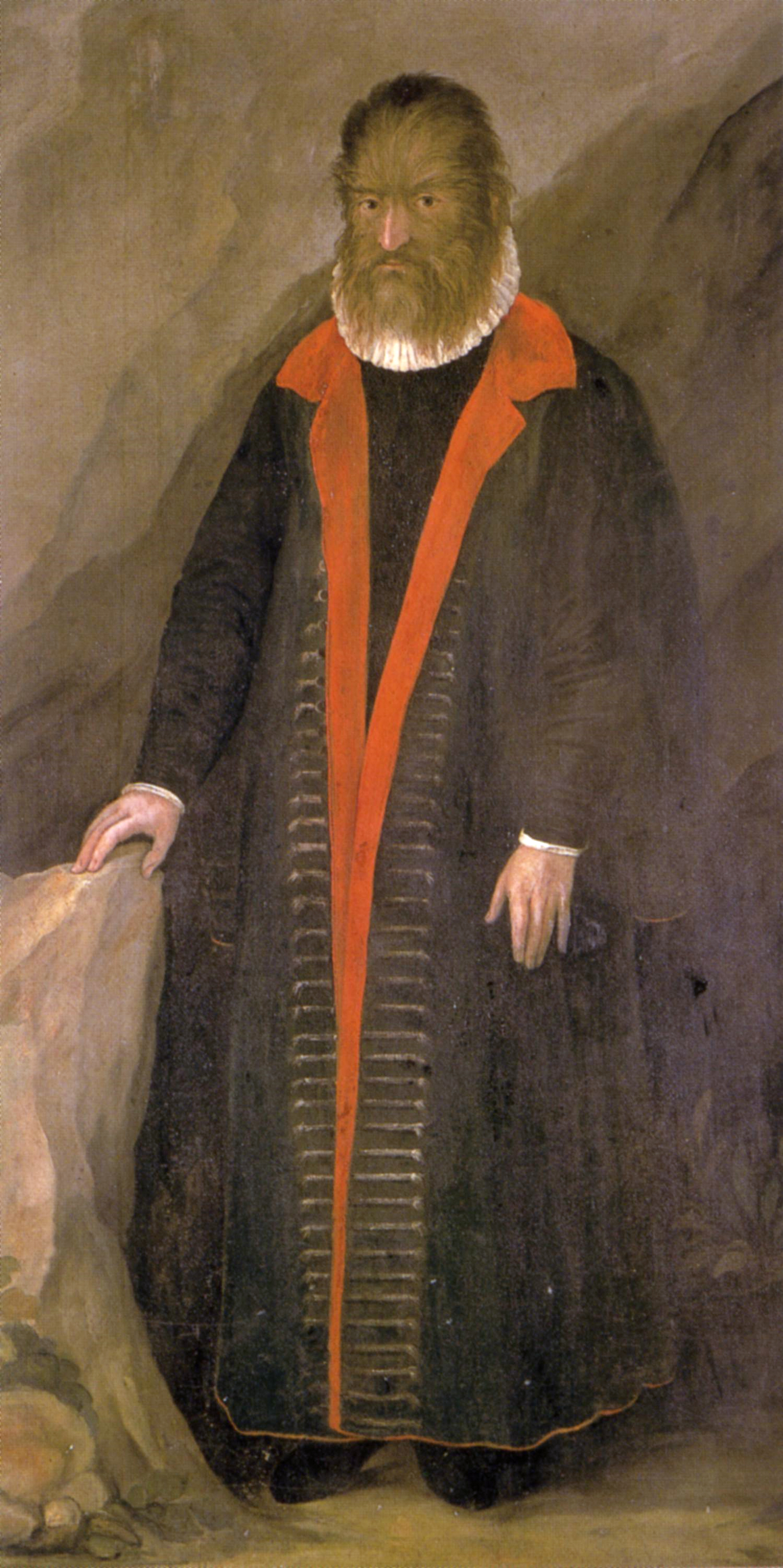
Petrus, Tognina's father.

The family's excessive hairiness attracted the interest of scholars. The Italian doctor and naturalist Ulisse Aldrovandi (1522–1605) reported in detail about the family in his book, Monstrorum Historia, published in 1642, and mentioned Ambras in Tyrol as their place of residence. In the local castle, Archduke Ferdinand II of Tyrol and Rudolf II had set up an art and curiosity chamber that included a huge collection of curiosities, which also housed a painting of the Gonsalvus family, made by Rudolf II's court painter, the Antwerp miniaturist Georg Hoefnagel. That painter mentioned the family as a special "species of animal" in a sketchbook for the Animalia Rationalia et Insecta.

Italian painter Lavinia Fontana made a famous portrait of little Tognina holding a letter that tells the story of the child's family.

"Don Pietro, a savage discovered on the Canary Islands, was shipped to his Serene Highness Henri King of France and from there to his Excellency the Duke of Parma. I, Antonietta, was born from him and today I can be found at the Court of Dame Isabella Pallavicini, the Honorable Marquise of Soragna.”

== Other references ==
In 2016, Tognina's portrait was used in a horror video game called Layers of Fear and represents a character nicknamed ‘Babyface.’

== Literature ==
- Hans Scheugl: Show Freaks & Monster. Felix Adanos Collection. DuMont Buchverlag: Cologne, 1978; p. 33ff. with illustrations
- Roberto Zapperi: The wild man of Tenerife. The miraculous story of Pedro Gonzalez and his children. Munich, CH Beck 2004, ISBN 978-3-406-44792-1
