= Josephine Clofullia =

Swiss-born bearded lady

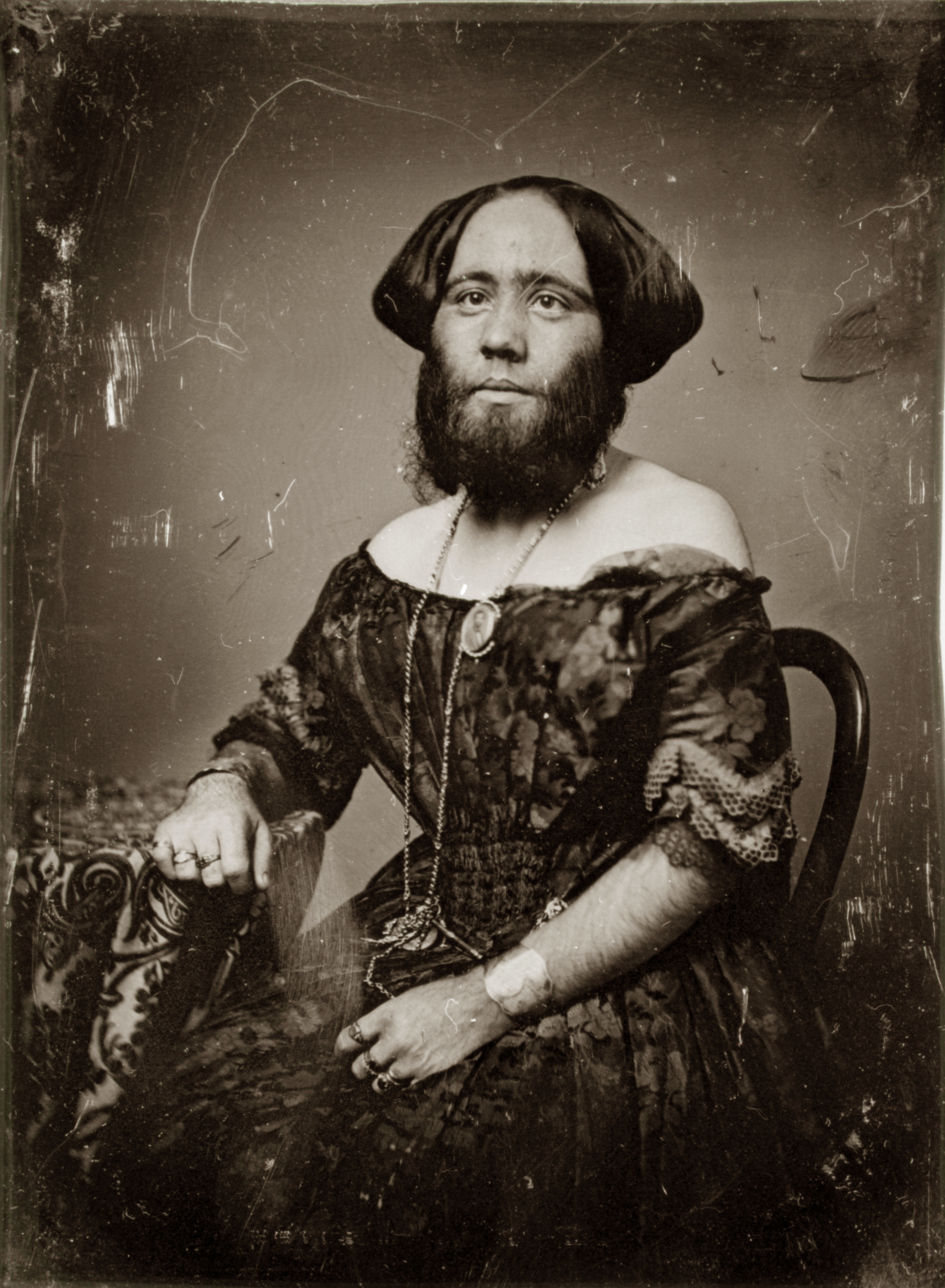
- Portrait of Josephine Clofullia
- Born: March 25, 1829; Versoix, Switzerland
- Died: 1870 (aged 40–41); Bridgwater, United Kingdom
- Occupation: Bearded lady
- Known for: Toured with P. T. Barnum's "American Museum"
- Relatives: One brother, three sisters

Josephine Clofullia (1829–1870) was a famous Swiss-born bearded lady who is most famous for being part of P. T. Barnum's "American Museum."

== Early life ==
Madame Clofullia, as she was often billed, was born Josephine Boisdechêne in Versoix, Switzerland to Brigadier Joseph Boisdechêne and Françoise Masset. She was born hairy and reputedly had a two-inch beard at the age of eight.

At eight, she was sent to boarding school in Geneva to be educated by the same institution as her mother. When she was fourteen, her mother died shortly after the death of her fifth child, and her father removed her from the school.

== Personal life ==
Josephine gave birth to two children; the first, a girl named Zelea, born in December 1851, died eleven months later. Her son Albert, who was born in December 1852, was also born with a layer of hair.

While comfortable in her home village, in many places when going out in public she would wear a handkerchief over the lower half of her face to not provoke attention or be accused of being a man in women's clothing.

== Touring career ==
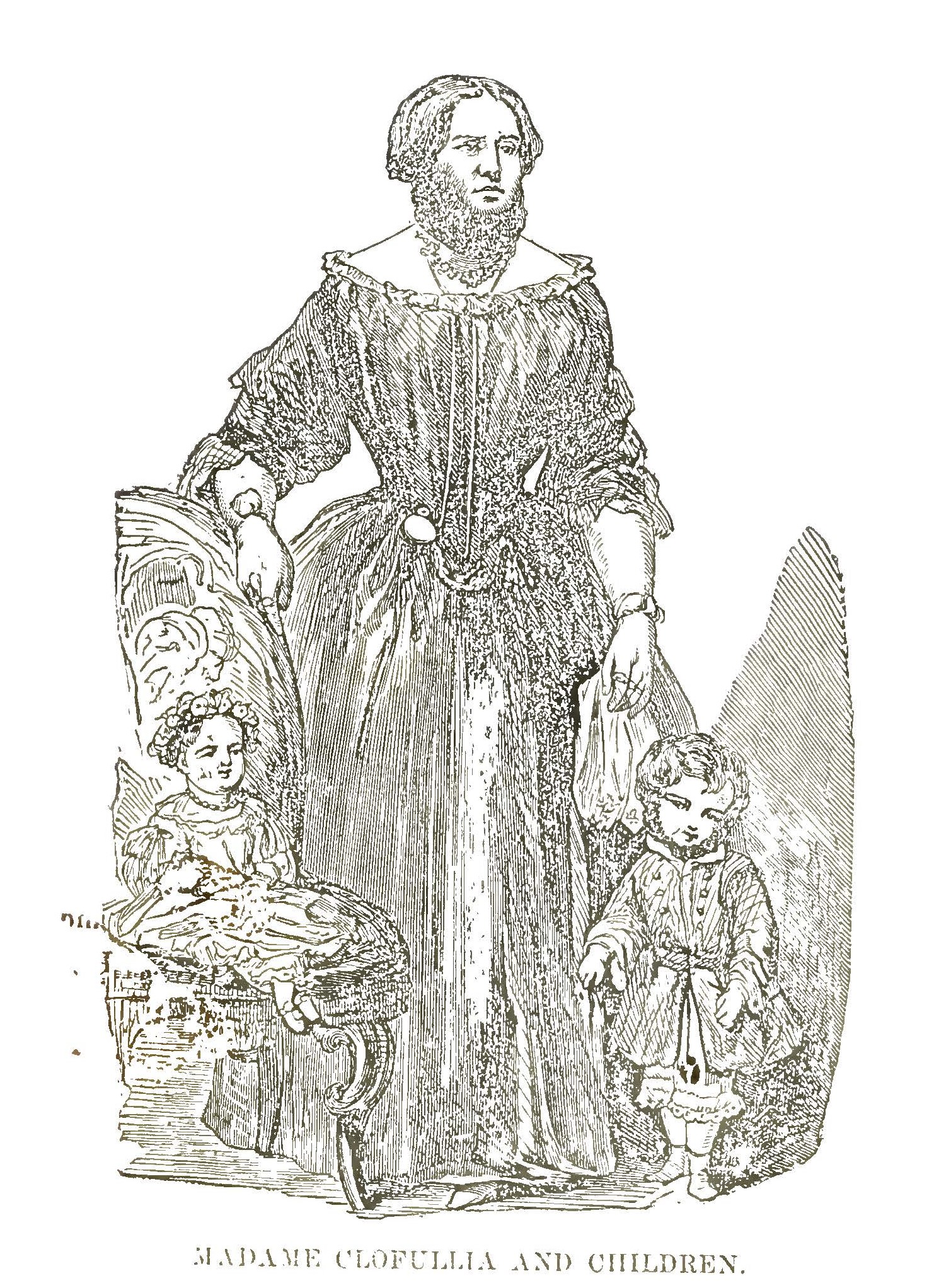
Depiction of Josephine with two young children, as published in a contemporary biography

In 1849, at the age of twenty, she began to tour Europe, first accompanied by her father and an agent and then with her father alone. In Paris she met painter Fortune Clofullia and eventually married him. She is notorious for fashioning her beard to imitate that of Napoleon III. In return, the ruler gave her a large diamond.

By early 1851 she had taken up residence in London, to take part in the Great Universal Exposition. where she visited Charing Cross Hospital to discuss her unusual medical condition, and was the following year the subject of an article for The Lancet.

In 1853, Clofullia, her husband, her son, and her father moved to the United States where they were introduced to P. T. Barnum. Barnum offered her a position at his American Museum, and she debuted there in March, 1853 as "The Bearded Lady of Geneva." For a period during her nine-month tenure her son was also featured as an attraction, where he was dubbed "Infant Esau", after the biblical character. Variations on this title would also later be used for other performers under Barnum, such as Annie Jones and Grace Gilbert.

Clofullia then entered into a new contract with Colonel J. H. Wood, the owner of Col. Wood's Museum, and toured through several U.S. States. By 1854, she was working in Havana, Cuba.

== Lawsuit ==
In July 1853 William Charr took Clofullia to court, claiming that she was actually a man and an impostor. During the case doctors examined her and verified that she was a female and the case was eventually dismissed. By hearsay it has been suspected that Barnum arranged the whole matter himself as a publicity stunt.

== Later life and death ==
In 1870 she was being exhibited at St. Matthews Fair in the town of Bridgwater, England. In late September, Josephine became ill and whilst recovering in the Bridgwater Workhouse Hospital, she died. Her cause of death was listed on her death certificate as a "low fever." She is buried in the paupers section of Wembdon Road Cemetery, Bridgwater.
