= Female beard =

Female beard may refer to:

- Bearded lady
- Beard (companion)
- Hirsutism
