= Wood's Museum =

Wood's Museum may refer to:

- Col. Wood's Museum, a museum in Chicago
- Wood's Museum and Metropolitan, a museum in New York
