= Ann Street (Manhattan) =

Street in Manhattan, New York

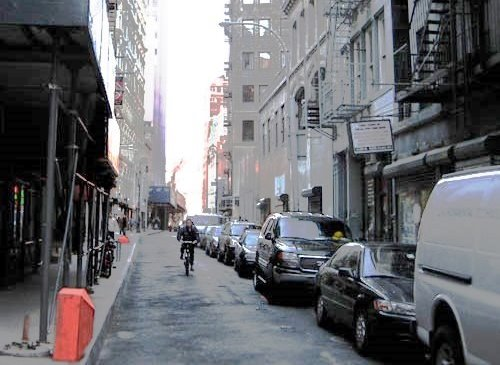
- Ann Street in the Financial District
- Interactive map of Ann Street
- Namesake: Ann White
- Maintained by: New York City Department of Transportation
- Location: Financial District, Lower Manhattan, New York City
- Postal code: 10038
- Coordinates: 40°42′37.44″N 74°00′25.2″W
- West end: Broadway; Park Row; Vesey Street
- Major junctions: Theatre Alley; Nassau Street; William Street
- East end: Gold Street

Construction
- Commissioned: c. 1728

Other
- Known for: Barnum's American Museum (former)

Ann Street is a 3-block-long street located in the Financial District in Lower Manhattan. It runs roughly east to west from Broadway to Gold Street.

== History ==
Ann Street is one of the oldest streets in New York City, appearing on a map created in 1728. Ann Street was named after Ann White, the wife of a developer and merchant, Capt. Thomas White. She may have urged him to name the street after her because other merchants' wives already had streets named after them. The street is relatively small and short compared with the other lower Manhattan streets named after merchants' wives.

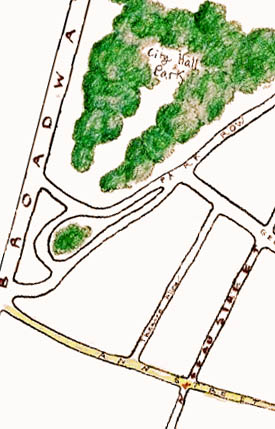
Ann Street (in yellow) is two blocks south of New York City Hall

There have been several other streets in the city named Ann Street. One laid out between Reade and Franklin Streets prior to 1797 later became Elm Street. "Anne Street" was also a name circa 1748 for part of the present William Street. Today, there is only one Ann Street in Manhattan.

In 1809, John Scudder, a former seaman, had taken over Edward Savage's "Columbian Gallery of Painting and City Museum" on Water Street, and added additional curiosities.

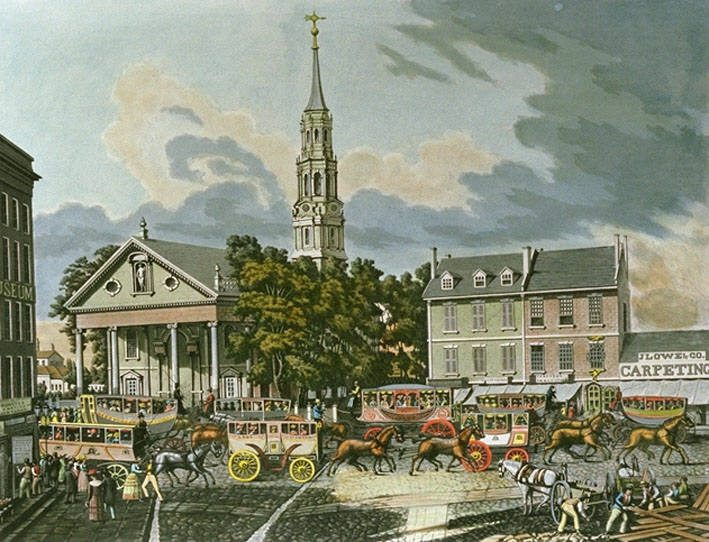
St. Paul's Chapel 1831 (Scudder's Museum far left)

He operated Scudder's American Museum on Chatham Street until 1817, when he relocated to the New York Institution on the site of the city's former almshouse in City Hall Park. The museum shared this space with the New-York Historical Society. Scudder died in 1821. In 1830, his son moved Scudder's American Museum to a five-story building on the corner of Broadway and Ann Street, across the street from St. Paul's Chapel.

In 1841 P.T. Barnum acquired Scudder's Museum. "Barnum's American Museum" became one of the most popular showplaces in the United States during the 19th century. Barnum made a special hit in 1842 with the exhibition of Charles Stratton, the celebrated midget "General Tom Thumb", as well as the Fiji Mermaid which he exhibited in collaboration with his Boston counterpart Moses Kimball. The line in the Charles Ives song, Barnum's Mob, Ann Street, refers to the crowds drawn to see the curiosities at this museum. Other nineteenth-century businesses on Ann Street include the publisher Dick and Fitzgerald on 18 Ann Street.

On May 10, 1979, a woman was attacked on Ann Street by a "pack of rats" as she was walking to her car. The woman hurried into the car and the rats climbed onto it. Several witnesses called the police. The rats were later found living in the burnt-out wreck of "Ryan's Cafe," a bar that had served the area since the 1860s. The bar had exploded due to a gas leak on December 11, 1970, and remained an empty lot throughout the 1970s. This empty lot was widely regarded to be the source of the rat problem. The city tugboat strike in 1979 compounded the problem as heaps of garbage collected on Ann Street and in the abandoned lot causing the rat population to explode. The rat attack incident prompted Mayor Ed Koch to order city pest control personnel to take immediate action on the problem. They killed and trapped hundreds of rats in just a few days, drawing media attention. The close proximity of Ann Street to City Hall made the incident all the more embarrassing. It helped to add to negative impressions of the city for years, but it also prompted people to act to improve downtown.

Broadway North from Ann Street about 1905

The recent addition of condominiums to the upper floors of the some of older buildings has added more life to the area. Ann Street was gutted and repaved in 2006, as part of a city water main replacement project, greatly reducing the rat problems and further beautifying the area. The corner of Ann and Vesey Streets, Park Row, and Broadway is still as busy as it was in Barnum's day, shoppers and tourists frequent J&R Computer World, one of the largest electronics stores in the nation.

== In popular culture ==
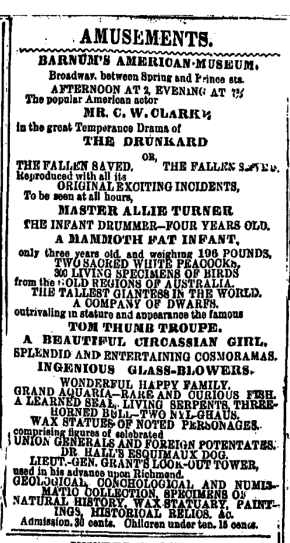
Barnum's American Museum was located on Ann Street.

Ann Street is the title and subject of a song by the early 20th century experimental classical composer Charles Ives with lyrics based on a poem written by Maurice Morris in 1921:

Quaint name Ann street.
Width of same, ten feet.
Barnum's mob Ann street,
Far from ob- solete.
Narrow, yes Ann street,
But business, Both feet.
Sun just hits Ann street,
Then it quits Some greet!
Rather short, Ann Street.

The crossing of Nassau Street and Ann Street is a highlight of the song and the street itself. Nassau Street is a business district filled with shops. At the intersection one can see a view deep into the heart of the Financial District and the facade of the New York Stock Exchange Building (NYSE) six blocks away. Nassau Street and Ann Street meet at uneven angles leading one to feel rather surprised by the sudden explosion of pedestrian traffic, shops and lights when crossing their intersection.

== See also ==
- Vesey Street—the western extension of Ann Street
- 2023 New York City parking garage collapse
