= 2023 New York City parking garage collapse =

Parking garage collapse in New York City

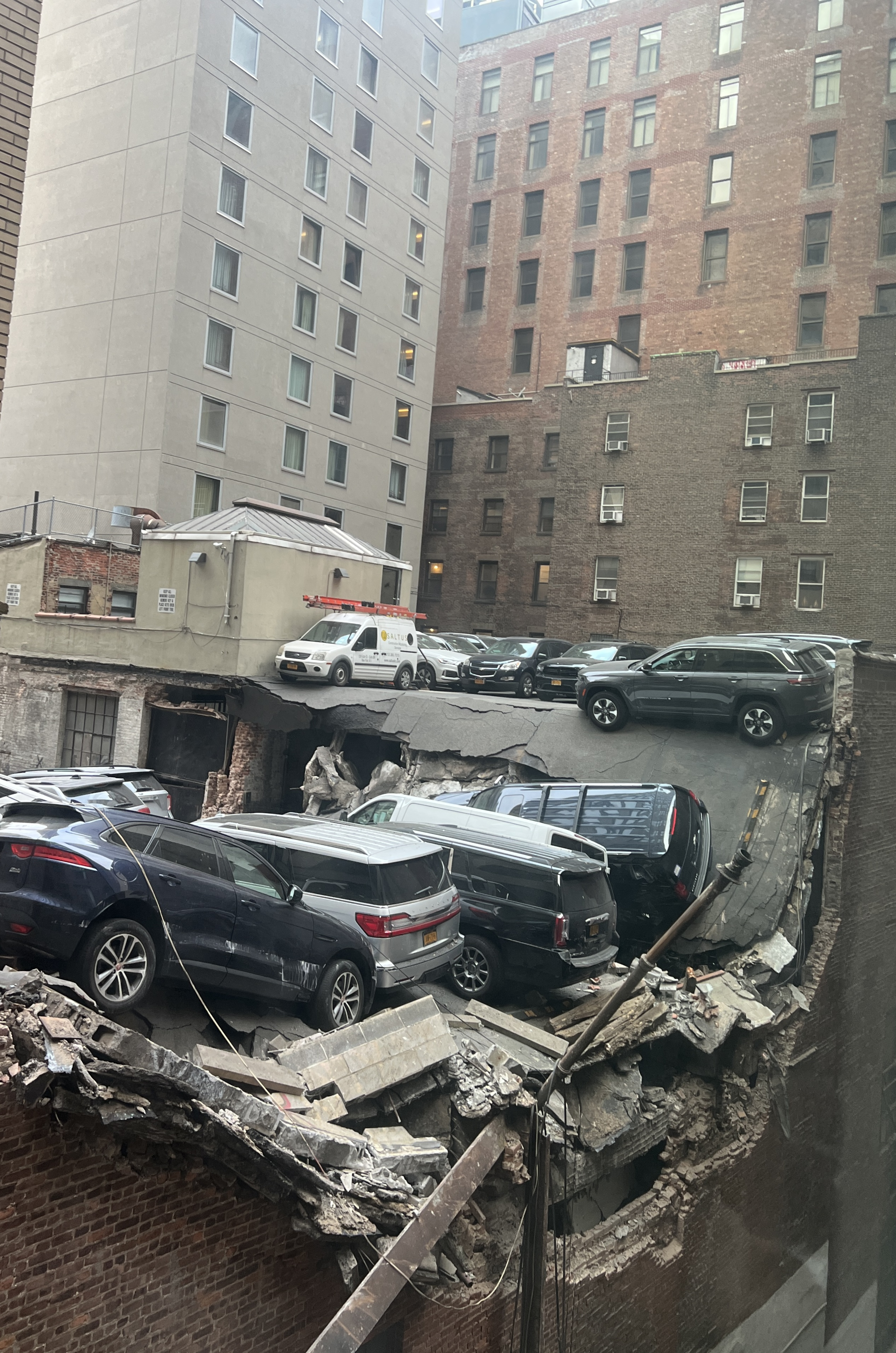
- The parking garage on the day after collapse
- Date: April 18, 2023
- Time: ~4 p.m. (EDT)
- Location: 57 Ann Street Manhattan, New York, United States; 40.7105°N 74.0065°W
- Type: Structural collapse
- Deaths: 1
- Injuries: 7

In the afternoon hours of April 18, 2023, a parking garage building partially collapsed in the Financial District of Manhattan in New York City, United States. The garage collapsed around 4 p.m. EDT (20:00 UTC), when its second floor partially collapsed below onto the first. The disaster, known as the Ann Street Building Collapse after its location on Ann Street, resulted in one death and seven injuries, and prompted the evacuation of neighboring buildings. The garage itself had a history of building violations since 1957, and was initially scheduled to be inspected by the New York City Department of Buildings (DOB) at the end of 2023, despite inspection of New York City parking garages not being required until 2022.

During the emergency management response, a robotic dog was deployed by the New York City Fire Department (FDNY), the first time the department used it in response to a structural collapse. In the structural collapse area, fire department officials noted shaking and vibrations, prompting DOB employees to inspect the building's stability in the immediate aftermath. After concerns that demolition work on the partially collapsed-garage would trigger a secondary collapse, it was temporarily stopped. The rear of the parking garage also collapsed on April 29 during the continuation of the demolition work, 11 days after the initial partial collapse of the structure. As a result of the collapse, local residents were displaced, and the New York City government began requiring examinations of parking garages across the city.

== Background ==
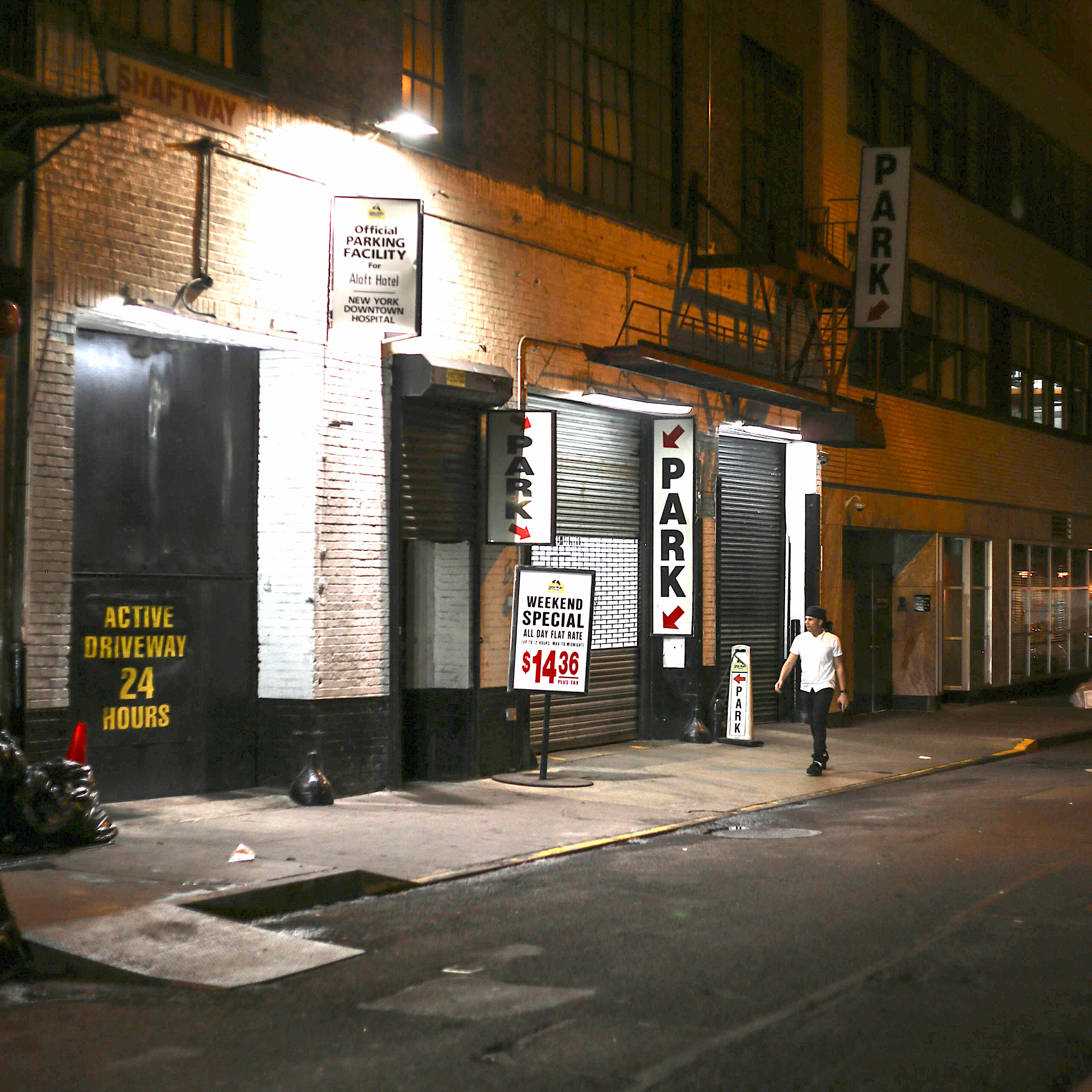
Parking garage's entrance on Ann Street, photographed in 2017

The building, which was located at 57 Ann Street in New York City's Financial District, was built in 1925. Both in 1926 and 1957, it was granted certificates of occupancy to operate as a garage holding "more than five" automobiles per level and for ten people to be on a floor at a time. The 1957 certificate mandated that the roof was only to hold "passenger-car type" vehicles. The New York City Sheriff's Office parked vehicles at the garage, six of which were present at the time of the collapse.

The building had received multiple building violations since 1957. In 2003, the DOB found concrete defects in the stairs, along with cracks in the first-floor ceiling, spalling concrete, steel beams with missing concrete coverings, and defective concrete with exposed cracks. In 2009, broken stairs and loose concrete was noted in numerous areas of the parking garage. The DOB found in 2011 "that the permitted repair work was ongoing and that the interior maintenance of the building was in good condition". However, in 2013, improper exit door issues were also noted. The DOB commissioner stated that there was also an application for work on the building in 2010 for the automobile lift, however the open violations were not addressed during the application. Overall, 19 violations were completed or defaulted, and an additional four were open which required a certificate of correction. The DOB issued 64 building-code violations to the garage's owner, 57 Ann Street Realty Association, between 1976 and 2023.

Prior to the collapse, there were no recent permits for construction at 57 Ann Street. Under a local law that required building inspections for all garages citywide by 2027, the DOB had been scheduled to inspect the garage before the end of 2023. Despite several previous nonfatal parking-garage collapses in New York City, regulation of the city's parking garages had generally been lax, and regular inspections of the city's garages had not been required until 2022.

== Collapse ==
The second floor of the parking garage partially collapsed onto the first floor at around 4 p.m. EDT on April 18, 2023. The collapse killed the garage's 59-year-old manager, Willis Moore. Initially, five people were reported injured, one of whom refused medical treatment. Local TV station WPIX later reported that seven workers had been injured, including the worker who had declined treatment.

Videos online showed numerous cars piled on top of each other. Students attending nearby classes at Pace University heard "a large noise and a big rumbling" and similar effects of an earthquake, along with screams during the collapse. Fire department officials noted shaking and vibrations in the collapse area, which prompted DOB employees to inspect the stability of the collapsed garage after being notified by them. The garage collapse event was known as the Ann Street Building Collapse after its location on Ann Street.

== Response ==
The New York City Police Department (NYPD) and the FDNY assisted with evacuations of nearby buildings and conducted rescues for people who were trapped in the collapsed garage. The Digidog, a robotic dog by Boston Dynamics, was deployed to help survey the collapse area in some places where emergency responders were unable to do so, along with a drone and tower ladders; it was the first time the FDNY used the Digidog in a structural collapse. Pace University canceled classes at their New York City campus and evacuated two university buildings. As emergency crews and management responded to the collapse, New York City Subway services ran at slower speeds on several lines, including lines A, C, J/Z, 2, and 3, leading to delays. New York City mayor Eric Adams called the building "completely unstable" as he visited the collapse site, and at one point the FDNY withdrew its personnel due to the unsafe building conditions. A street was blocked off due to fears that the buckled facade would collapse onto the street. According to local media sources, initial findings attributed the age of the structure and an excess number of vehicles on the roof of the structure as contributing causes to the collapse.

Moore's body was retrieved the day after the collapse. Following the collapse, the building was scheduled to be razed via controlled demolition. Although some sources said there had been between 80 and 90 vehicles in the garage just before it collapsed, the FDNY estimated that there had been about 40 cars in the building. On April 20, cranes began demolishing the remains of the garage, and a connected parking garage located at 25 Beekman Street was also to be demolished. However, demolition was temporarily delayed due to concerns that the work would trigger a secondary collapse on the collapsed garage. The rear of the garage partially collapsed on April 29, 2023, while it was being demolished.

=== Vacate orders and inspections ===
After the collapse, the DOB issued full or partial vacate orders to occupants of six buildings. A neighboring Pace University building at 161 William Street was also deemed unstable; Pace closed the building for the rest of its spring semester while the party wall between the garage and Pace's building was shored up. The adjoining block of Ann Street was closed for several months, displacing residents of that block.

New York City building inspectors conducted inspections of parking structures across the city. Shortly after the collapse, a DOB spokesperson found 61 parking garages to be "immediately hazardous", citing them to be improperly maintained and in poor structural condition. In late April, four additional garages in Manhattan and Brooklyn were closed for posing "an immediate threat to public safety". One engineer indicated that the garage-inspection process could have saved lives if it had occurred earlier. Several dozen garages with similar problems to the garage at 57 Ann Street had been identified by May 2023. In November, the discovery of similar structural issues at another garage overlying Amtrak's West Side Line in Manhattan led to disruption of the Empire Service.

=== Investigation ===
In early 2024, the city government hired a structural engineer to investigate the collapse. The results of the report, published in April 2025, found that the collapse had occurred when workers tried to repair a cracked pier by removing masonry, under the mistaken assumption that there was a steel column encased within the masonry. The weight of cars on the roof had put excessive pressure on the weakened pier, causing a cascading failure of the structure. The report also found that the structure suffered from deferred maintenance, with issues such as corroded rebar and cracked concrete, and that it was frequently overloaded beyond its weight limit.
