= Sidonia de Barcsy =

Hungarian baroness and bearded lady

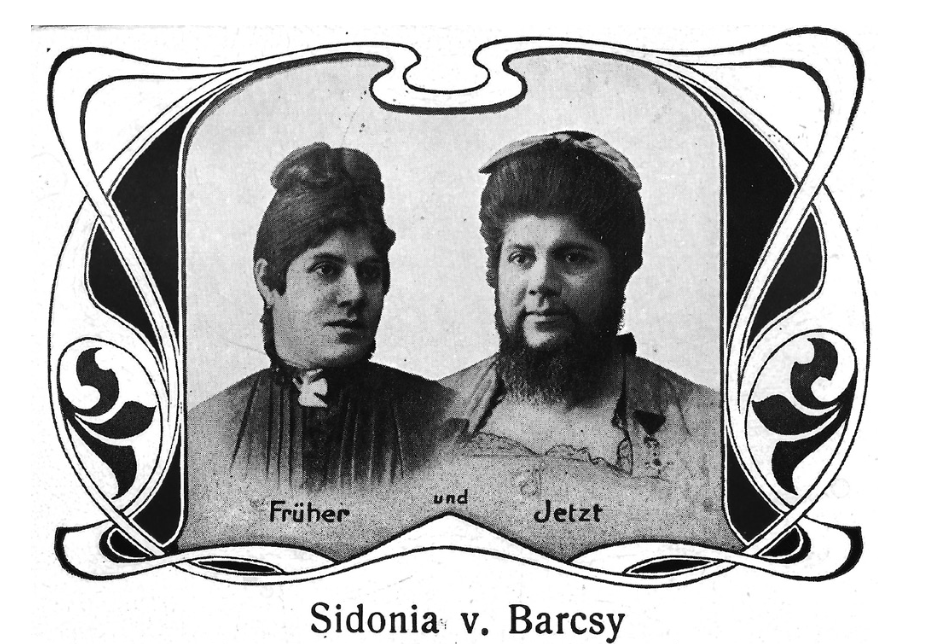
Before-and-after picture postcard of de Barcsy

Sidonia de Barcsy (March 1, 1866–July 31, 1925) was a Hungarian baroness and bearded lady. She grew a beard after the birth of her first son, and performed in Western Europe and America.

== Biography ==
At the age of eighteen, de Barcsy gave birth to her only son, Nicu. Two weeks later, she began to grow a beard, a development which her doctor initially concealed from her.

Around 1890, de Barcsy's husband, Antonio, became impoverished, and the family began performing in Western Europe as a traveling troupe. Sidonia was advertised as a bearded lady; Nicu, who would reach an adult height of less than a meter, was displayed as "The smallest Perfect Man on Earth"; and Antonio performed as a strongman.

In 1903, the family troupe emigrated to the United States. There they performed with a number of shows, including the Hagenbeck-Wallace and Ringling Bros. and Barnum & Bailey circuses. Antonio began to perform as a stage magician, and Nicu as an escape artist.

After Antonio's death in 1912, de Barcsy married Frederick Valentine Tischer, a trick roper. Tischer's gambling drove the family into debt, and de Barcsy signed on with the Campbell Brothers Circus to pay it off. This brought them to Drummond, Oklahoma, where they settled permanently. Tischer eventually abandoned de Barcsy, who died on 19 October 1925.
