= Thaon-les-Vosges =

- Commune
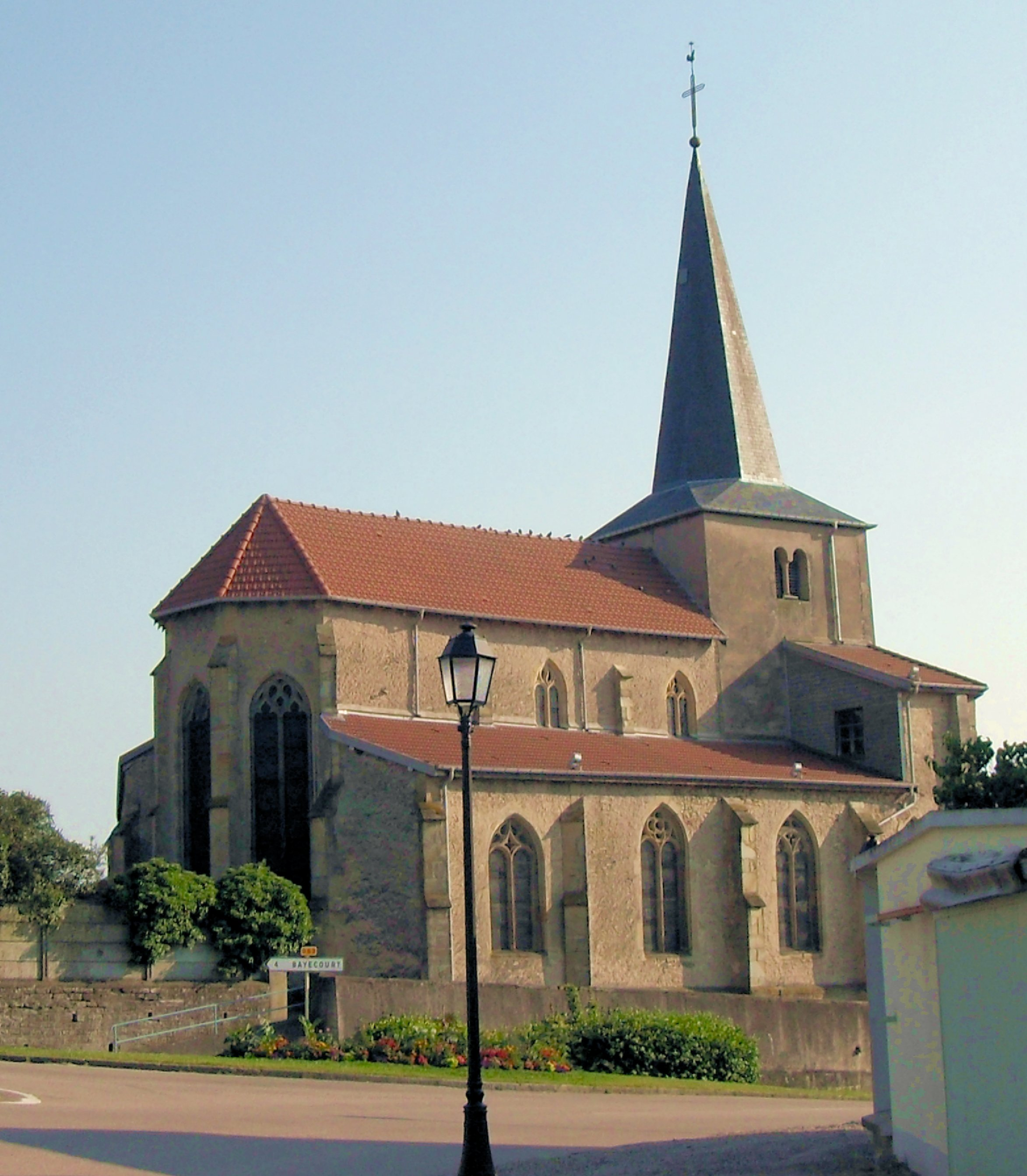
- The church in Girmont
- Location of Thaon-les-Vosges
- Location within France Location within Grand Est
- Coordinates: 48°15′04″N 6°25′12″E
- Country: France
- Region: Grand Est
- Department: Vosges
- Arrondissement: Épinal
- Canton: Golbey
- Intercommunality: CA Épinal

Government
  - Mayor (2020–2026): Cédric Haxaire
- Area^{1}: 28.37 km^{2} (10.95 sq mi)
- Population (2023): 8,547
  - Density: 301.3/km^{2} (780.3/sq mi)
- Time zone: UTC+01:00 (CET)
  - Summer (DST): UTC+02:00 (CEST)
- INSEE/Postal code: 88465 /88150
- ^{1} French Land Register data, which excludes lakes, ponds, glaciers > 1 km^{2} (0.386 sq mi or 247 acres) and river estuaries.

Thaon-les-Vosges (French pronunciation: [taɔ̃ le voʒ]; before 2022: Capavenir Vosges [kapav(ə)niʁ voʒ]) is a commune in the Vosges department of northeastern France. The municipality was established on 1 January 2016 and consists of the former communes of Thaon-les-Vosges, Girmont and Oncourt.

== Population ==
Population data refer to the area corresponding with the commune as of January 2025.

Historical population
Year	Pop.	±% p.a.
1968	8,371	—
1975	8,620	+0.42%
1982	8,433	−0.31%
1990	8,659	+0.33%
1999	8,876	+0.28%
2007	9,139	+0.37%
2012	9,059	−0.18%
2017	8,862	−0.44%
2023	8,547	−0.60%
Source: INSEE

== Notable people ==
- Clémentine Delait (1865–1939), celebrated woman who had hirsutism (excessive body hair); entrepreneur, owner of the Bearded Lady Café
- Noël Fiessinger (1881–1946), physician

== See also ==
- Communes of the Vosges department

== Company with headquarters ==
- Moustache Bikes
- Garrett Motion
