= Moustache Bikes =

French electric bicycle company

Moustache Bikes is a French brand of EPAC (electronically power assisted cycle), named Cycle Me, a company based in the Vosges since 2011.

== Concept ==
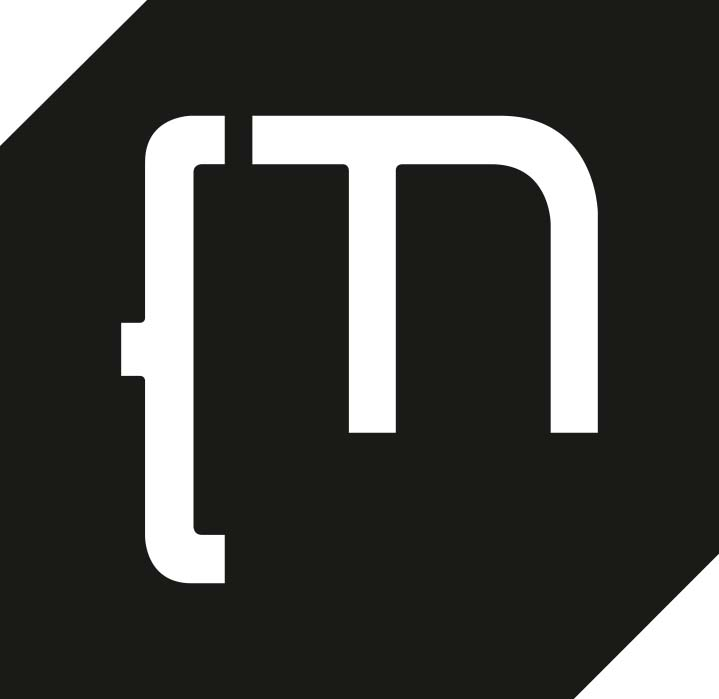

Vosges-based Cycle Me designs and assembles electric bicycles under the Moustache Bikes brand in the Vosges region. The name refers to the moustache-shaped handlebars of the early 20th century. The company's bicycle designs include integrated frames and proprietary components. The bicycles are positioned in the premium price segment.

The brand offers models for various uses, including city, mountain, and cargo bikes.

The metal frames are primarily imported from Taiwan, although a wooden frame was also tested. All models feature batteries and an electric motor from German equipment manufacturer Bosch.

The bicycles were first sold through approximately 100 independent retailers in France and a hundred or so in Europe (England, Germany and the Benelux countries) and in 2019 were shipped to 500 dealers all over the world. 45% of their production is exported.

== Story ==
Cycle Me was created in 2011 by Emmanuel Antonot and Grégory Sand, in Golbey, near Épinal. Emmanuel Antonot previously worked for Lapierre bikes, one of Europe's oldest bicycle manufacturers.

Sales increased from 1,500 units in 2012 to 3,000 in 2013. In 2015, the FCPR Initiative et Finance announced that it had acquired a stake in the company's capital. Following the investment, the founders maintained a majority stake in the company.

In 2017, the assembly plant moved to Thaon-les-Vosges with capacity to produce 100,000 bikes per year. The assembly workshop can assemble 200 bikes per day. The research and development department handles prototype design at the Thaon-les-Vosges facility. The company employs around one hundred people and had a turnover of around 70,000,000 in 2019.

In 2021, the company added a third assembly line and began assembling wheels at their facility.
