= Magdalena Ventura with Her Husband and Son =

Painting by Jusepe de Ribera

- The Bearded Woman
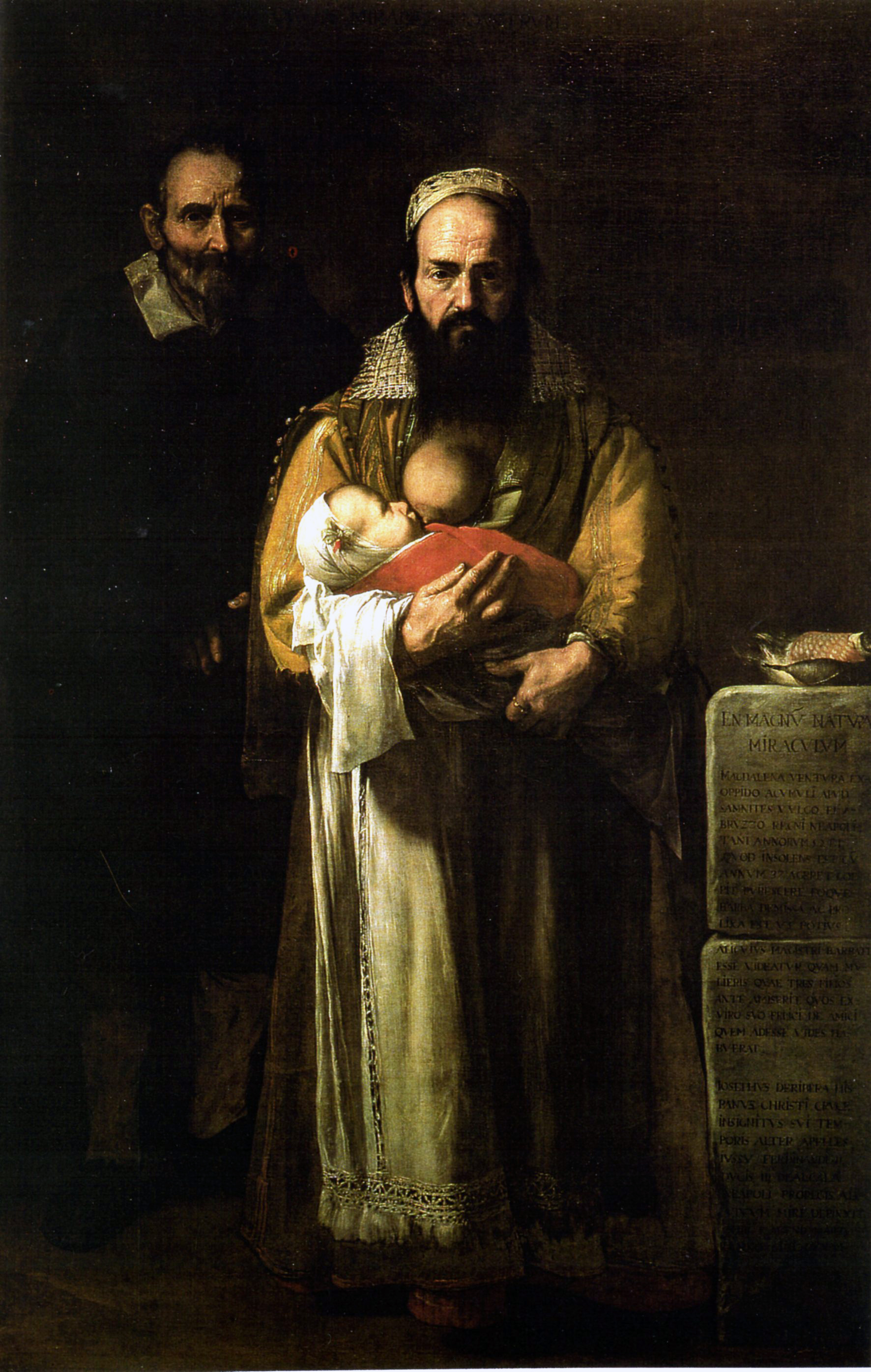
- Year: 1631
- Dimensions: 212 cm (83 in) × 144 cm (57 in)
- Location: Louvre, Real Academia de Bellas Artes de San Fernando, Hospital de Tavera
- Owner: Fernando Afán de Ribera

Magdalena Ventura with Her Husband and Son or The Bearded Lady is a 1631 oil on canvas painting by the Spanish artist Jusepe de Ribera. It is now part of the Fundación Casa Ducal de Medinaceli collection and displayed at the Museo Nacional del Prado in Madrid.

== Description ==
The painting displays Magdalena Ventura standing while nursing her baby, with her husband standing behind her in the shadows. To the right are two steles, the top one listing the details of their family story in Latin, proclaiming it as A Wonder of Nature. The second stele extols her unusual nature while still having a child and husband, as well as the work of the painter and the proud owner who commissioned it.

The painting was mentioned in various period diaries. All of the information known about Magdalena Ventura is derived from quotes and documents referring to the painting. Supposedly, the Duke of Alcalá was moved to commission the painting based on rumors that he had heard about her.

The stele claims that, at the time of painting, the main subject was 52, and that she had begun to show facial hair growth at 37. She had at least two other children, and was an Italian from the nearby region of Abruzzi. Magdalena likely helped with or was the primary source of income through her facial hair, as the painting shows her with a long, untrimmed beard. This is in stark contrast to her husband's more fashionably trimmed beard. The simple act of standing while nursing is also an unusual pose for a 17th-century woman, and seems to have been associated with accounts of strong African women nursing in unusual ways. Painting Magdalena Ventura in such a manner would have served to emphasize her "manliness" and strength.

The painting was part of a gallery of portraits of people deemed "unusual", particularly of people with characteristics popular among traveling acts of the period, like dwarfism. Ribera was later commissioned to make another portrait, this time of a club-footed boy, The Clubfoot (1642).

== See also ==
- Bearded lady

== Bibliography ==
- Brown, Jonathan; Kagan, Richard L. (1987). "The Duke of Alcalá: His Collection and Its Evolution". The Art Bulletin (on JSTOR). 69 (2): 231–255.
