= Helena Antonia =

Bearded female court dwarf

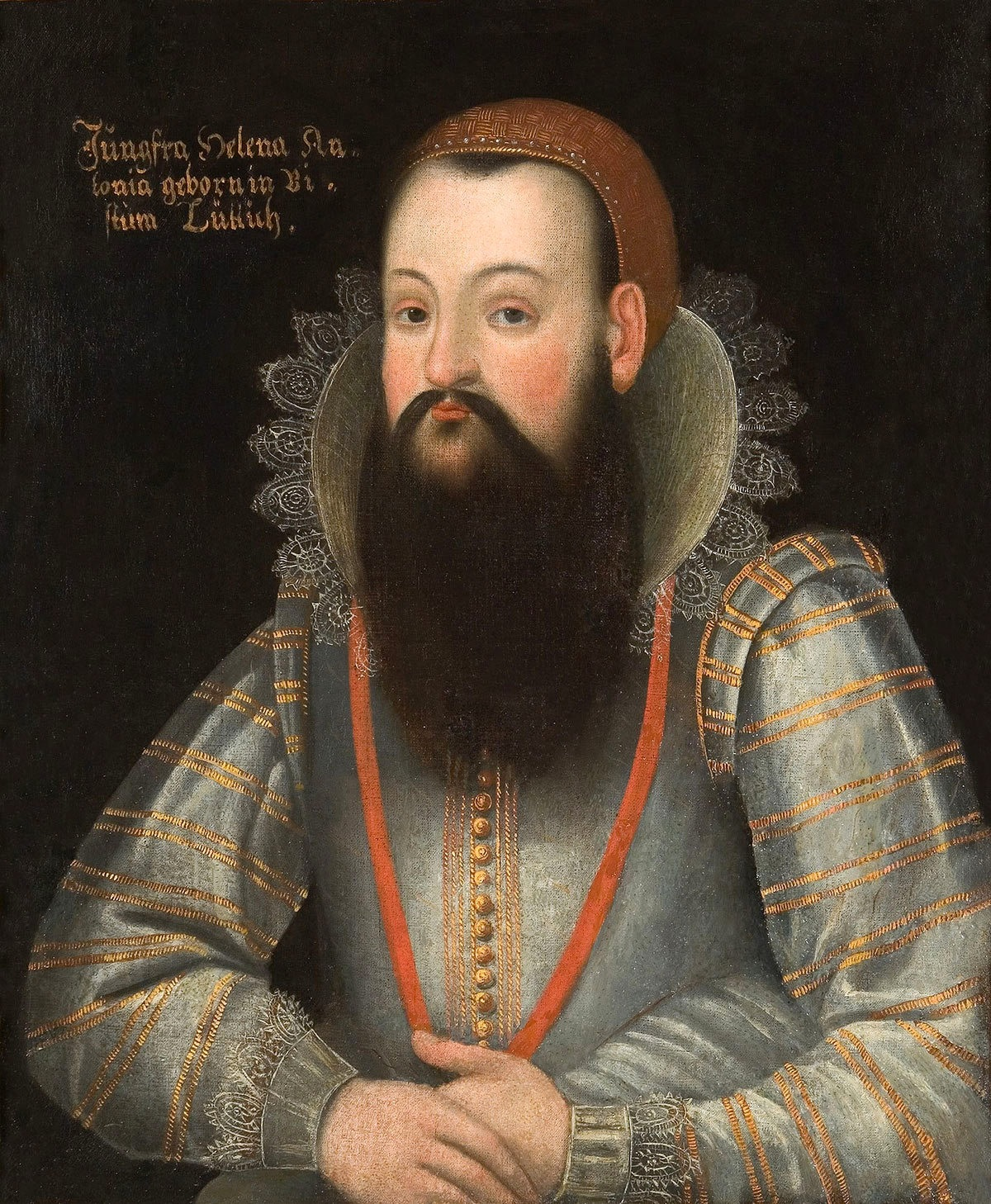
- Portrait of Helena Antonia of Liège
- Born: 1579; Liège
- Died: after 1621
- Occupations: Court dwarf, lady-in-waiting
- Known for: Being a bearded lady and a favorite of Margaret of Austria, Queen of Spain

Helena Antonia (1579 – d. after 1621) was a bearded female court dwarf of Maria of Austria, Holy Roman Empress and was a favorite of Margaret of Austria, Queen of Spain, and also a lady-in-waiting for Constance of Austria, Queen of Poland.

== Life ==
Helena Antonia was born in Liège. Her parentage is not documented, but she was likely born to commoner parents. Her life is described in the chronicle of Christian August Vulpius from 1811. From the age of nine, she started to grow facial hair. This was likely caused by hirsutism. In that time period, women with beards were viewed as objects of attractions at Freak shows. At a loss on what to do with her, her parents gave her as a gift to Ernest of Bavaria, who was the Prince-Bishop of her home city of Liège in 1581–1612. The Prince-Bishop gave her as a gift to Charles II, Archduke of Austria, and Helena Antonia left for Graz in Austria. Charles II died in 1590, and Helena Antonia came into the household of his widow, Maria Anna of Bavaria (born 1551).

Helena Antonia was described by Christian August Vulpius at this time as "healthy, friendly, mild of temperament, skillful in many chores and with quite a good mind. Her face was long and diminutive, with glowing black eyes, red cheeks; and at the age of eighteen, her beard reached her chest. Dressed in a lady's costume of that time she mostly wore green, decorated with a golden chain". In 1595, at the age of sixteen, she was painted by one of the court painters, and during the next couple of years, she was painted by Johannes Löselius, Dominicus Custos, and Ulisse Aldrovandi. The physician Johannes Schenck von Grafenberg at this point referred to Helena Antonia as a monster because of her facial hair.

In December 1605, Constance of Austria, daughter of Charles II and Maria Anna, married the king of Poland, Sigismund III Vasa, in Krakow. Helena Antonia belonged to the entourage accompanying Constance to Poland. She was one of the ladies-in-waiting that Constance painted, sitting in a carriage at the formal entry of Constance to Krakow. It is not known exactly how long Helena Antonia served as a lady-in-waiting of Constance in Poland.

By 1621, she had left her employ in the household of Queen Constance. In this year, she appeared at a freak show in Wrocław, where she was again portrayed by two painters. One of the portraits had the text: "Portrait of Miss Helena Antonia, born in the Bishopric of Liège, with a big beard, who came to Wrocław in 1621 and appeared in public". At this occasion, she was mocked by the spectators who claimed that her beard grew because no man wanted to marry her. It is not known what happened to Helena Antonia after her appearance in Wrocław in 1621.

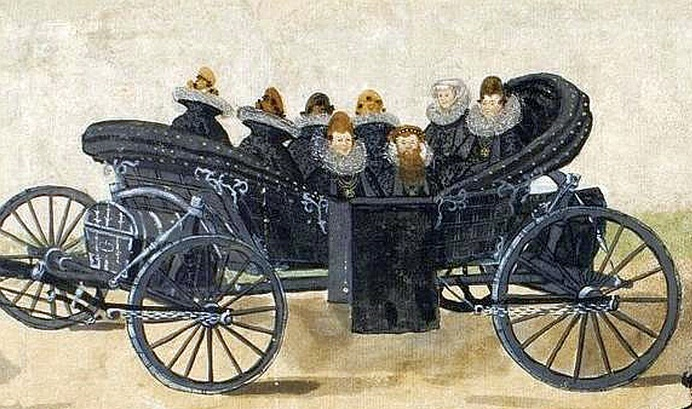
Helena Antonia and other courtier women
