= 1970 New York City gas explosion =

Coordinates: 40.71122°N 74.00813°W

- Date: December 11, 1970; 55 years ago
- Location: Manhattan, New York, U.S.
- Deaths: 12
- Injuries: 60

A gas explosion occurred on December 11, 1970, at a building at Park Row and Ann Street in Manhattan, New York City, killing 12 people and injuring more than 60. The two upper floors of the building had been recently converted into a Chinese restaurant, which required a new gas line to be installed. A city inspector failed to notice defects in the new line and issued a certification on December 2. Although gas service was not scheduled to be turned on until December 14, the owner of the restaurant "clandestinely" arranged to have the gas turned on earlier, on December 11. Several hours later, at around 2:00pm, the unopened Chinese restaurant exploded, killing and injuring patrons in a nearby restaurant and in a barbershop, both co-located in the building. Patrons in a tavern on the first floor of the building were also injured, as were people walking on the sidewalk next to the building and workers in neighboring buildings. The five-alarm fire that followed sent flames 30 feet (9 m) into the air. The blaze was brought under control in 90 minutes by 200 firemen. In 1983, the New York Court of Appeals ruled that New York City was not liable for the explosion, stating that "a general obligation to all members of the public was not sufficient to establish liability in particular cases."

== 1979 rat attack incident ==
On May 12th, 1979, a woman was attacked and injured by a pack of rats on Ann Street. The police traced the rats back to the burned out lot of Ryan's Cafe, which had been destroyed in the explosion and was now being used as an illegal dumping ground. More than 300 rats were exterminated by sanitation workers on the site by injecting zinc phosphates into their burrows.
