= Harnaam Kaur =

British model (born 1990)

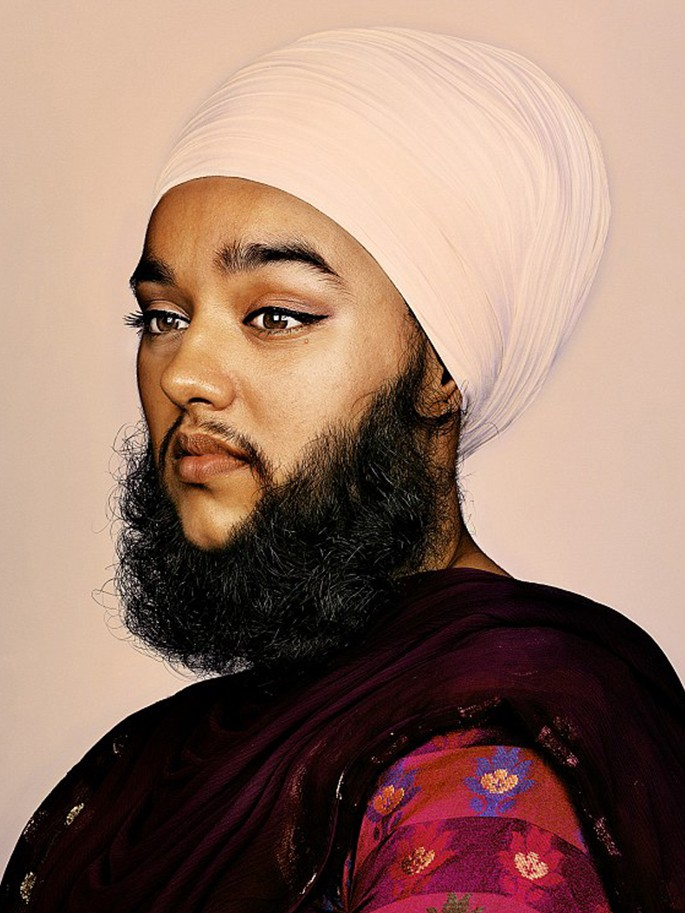
- Kaur in 2015
- Born: 29 November 1990 (age 35); Slough, Berkshire, England
- Occupations: Social media influencer, model, motivational speaker
- Known for: Social media, fitness and motivational speaking

Harnaam Kaur (born 29 November 1990) is a British social media personality, postpartum coach, life coach, and motivational speaker.

== Early life ==
Kaur was born in Slough, Berkshire on 29 November 1990 in what she describes as "a traditional Punjabi family". At the age of 12, Kaur was diagnosed with polyendocrine metabolic ovarian syndrome (PMOS), which is due to elevated androgens (male hormones) in females. One of the symptoms of PMOS is hirsutism, or the ability to grow excessive facial and body hair. Kaur is able to grow a full beard as a result of her condition. While Kaur initially attempted to remove her facial hair due to constant bullying, she has grown to embrace her unconventional appearance and has become a spokesperson for the body positivity movement. In an interview with Rock N Roll Bride, Kaur reflects on her decision to keep her beard: "I decided to keep my beard and step forward against society's expectations of what a woman should look like. Today I am not suicidal and I do not self-harm. Today I am happy living as a young beautiful bearded woman. I have realised that this body is mine, I own it, I do not have any other body to live in so I may as well love it unconditionally".

== Career ==
Kaur worked as a primary school teaching assistant at Khalsa Primary School before coming to media attention in 2014, when she started giving public interviews. After achieving fame, Kaur became a full-time public figure and freelance model and motivational speaker.

In March 2015, photographer Mr. Elbank included a photo of Kaur in his exhibit at Somerset House in London, which featured portraits of over 80 individuals with beards. In June 2015, Kaur modeled for Rock N Roll Bride and was photographed by Louisa Coulthurst of Urban Bridesmaid Photography. In November 2015, Kaur joined the "Eff Your Beauty Standards" campaign founded by Tess Holliday as a spokesperson and representative.

In March 2016, Kaur became the first woman with a beard to walk at London Fashion Week. She opened the show for designer Marianna Harutunian. She is signed to Wanted Models in Paris and continues to be featured in fashion spreads in both online and print magazines. In May 2016, the conceptual artist Annelies Hofmeyr featured Kaur in her project Trophy Wife Barbie, where Hofmeyr altered a Barbie doll to Kaur's likeness.

In July 2016, musician Aisha Mizra featured Kaur in the music video for her song "Fuck Me or Destroy Me".

In September 2016, Kaur was included in the Guinness World Records as the youngest woman in the world to have a full beard. Her record citation read: "Now with a beard measuring as long as six inches [15 cm] in places, she overcame years of bullying to take ownership of her appearance and achieve this record title at the age of 24 years 282 days".

In March 2017, Kaur was featured in the Teen Vogue article "Instagrammers Challenge Body and Facial Hair Stigma".

In August 2017, Kaur collaborated with the grooming company Captain Fawcett to create and design a beard oil elixir. Kaur models in the advertisement campaign for the beard oil.

=== Activism ===
In interviews and on social media, Kaur references the abuse and harassment she received as a teenager that led to her self-harm and attempted suicide. In 2017, Kaur contributed to panel discussions in the House of Parliament on topics relating to mental health, body image, cyberbullying, LGBTQIA+ and how social media, businesses, schools and the government can help with the development of positive body images.

Kaur uses her profiles on Instagram, Twitter, Facebook and YouTube to contribute to numerous body-positive campaigns. She frequently posts content to promote awareness of body shaming, cyberbullying and mental illness. Kaur also aims to challenge gender stereotypes in media. She has said, "I don't think I believe in gender. I want to know who said a vagina is for a woman and a penis is for a man, or pink is for a girl and blue is for a boy. I am sitting here with a vagina and boobs – and a big beautiful beard".

== Personal life ==
While Kaur has referenced her conversion to Sikhism at age 16 as one of the reasons she stopped removing her facial hair, she now describes herself as spiritual rather than religious. Traditionally, Sikhism forbids the cutting of hair. She continues to wear her turban or other head coverings, which is a custom of the Khalsa tradition of Sikhism.

Kaur is originally from Slough, England. Her younger brother, Gurdeep Singh Cheema, created the film Happy Ending? The Dangers of Online Grooming to bring awareness to the issue of online child grooming by predators.

To promote self-love and acceptance, Kaur has stated that she has named her beard Sundri, which means beauty or beautiful, and refers to her beard as "she".

Kaur is pansexual.

== See also ==
- Polyendocrine metabolic ovarian syndrome (PMOS)
- Hirsutism
- Bearded lady
