= Jane Barnell =

American bearded lady

Jane Barnell as Lady Olga Roderick, (The Bearded Lady)
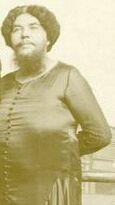
- Jane Barnell as Lady Olga, c. 1915
- Born: Martha Jane Barhill; January 3, 1876; Wilmington, North Carolina, United States
- Died: July 21, 1945 (aged 69); Manhattan, New York, United States
- Other names: Princess Olga; Madame Olga; Lady Olga; Lady Olga Roderick
- Occupations: Sideshow performer, actress
- Years active: 1883-?
- Known for: Freaks
- Notable work: Great Orient Circus and Menagerie (1883-?; John Robison's Circus (1892-c.1906); Ringling Brothers; Huberts Dime Museum

Martha Jane Barnhill (January 3, 1876 – July 21, 1945), professionally known as Jane Barnell, was an American bearded lady, sideshow performer, and actress. Born with hirsutism, she spent more than five decades performing with circuses, dime museums, and carnivals under stage names including Princess Olga, Madame Olga, Lady Olga, and Lady Olga Roderick. She is best known for her appearance as the Bearded Lady, billed as Olga Roderick, in Tod Browning's 1932 film Freaks. Barnell's life, which included being sold to a circus as a child, touring in Europe, and working in a variety of entertainment professions, was later documented by writer Joseph Mitchell, whose 1940 profile remains one of the few detailed contemporary accounts of her life.

== Early life ==
Barnell was born Martha Jane Barnhill in Wilmington, North Carolina, on January 3, 1876. She was the second of six children born to George W. Barnhill and Nancy Shaw, and was named after her maternal grandmother. Her mother was of Irish and Catawba ancestry.

By the age of 2, Barnell had begun growing a beard as a result of hirsutism. Believing she had been cursed, her mother took her to hoodoo doctors and other folk healers in an unsuccessful attempt to remove the condition.

At about the age of 3, while her father was away on business, Barnell was sold by her mother to the Great Orient Family Circus and Menagerie. She toured the American South before being taken to Europe with a German circus. While in Berlin, she contracted typhoid fever, was admitted to a charity hospital, and was later placed in an orphanage. By the time she was 5, Barnell had been reunited with her father and returned to the United States.

After returning to North Carolina, Barnell lived with her maternal grandmother in Mecklenburg County, North Carolina. As a teenager, she shaved regularly in an attempt to conceal her beard. In 1893, at the age of 17, inspired by stories of Florence Nightingale told by her grandmother, Barnell began training as a student nurse at the city hospital in Wilmington. She worked there for about a year before leaving after what she later described as an unpleasant incident and returning to her grandmother's farm.

== Career ==
In spring 1892, she met a circus performer, Professor William Heckler, who talked her into stopping shaving and got her employment with John Robinson's Circus. At that time, her beard was 13 inches long. She went back to North Carolina every winter until her grandmother died in 1899. She worked with the Robinson circus for fourteen years.

At some point during her life, Barnell worked as a trapeze artist before having a railroad accident that ended her career. She then became a commercial photographer.

Barnell toured for a time with a number of circuses, including the Ringling Brothers circus, and later joined Hubert's Museum in Times Square, New York City.

In April 1935, she was working at the Ringling Brothers' sideshow at Madison Square Garden.

In 1940, she was interviewed by Joseph Mitchell for an article for The New Yorker. His interview is one of the few sources that exists about her life.

== Marketing and public image ==
Barnell performed under several stage names, including Princess Olga, Madame Olga, Lady Olga and Lady Olga Roderick. By the early 1890s, she had adopted Lady Olga Roderick as her principal stage name while appearing as a bearded lady with John Robinson's Circus.

In 1932, at the age of 56, Barnell appeared in Tod Browning's film Freaks, billed as Olga Roderick, the Bearded Lady. According to the documentary Freaks: The Sideshow Cinema, she was later unhappy with the film's portrayal of sideshow performers.

== Marriage and relationships ==
Barnell married four times. According to her later recollections, her first husband was a German musician who played in the band for John Robinson's Circus. She and her husband had two children, but within a few years Barnell had lost both children and her husband.

Barnell's second husband was a balloonist who was killed months after their marriage. Her third marriage ended in divorce after her husband developed alcoholism.

In 1931, at about the age of 55, Barnell married her manager, Thomas O'Boyle, an orphan and former circus clown who worked as a sideshow talker at Hubert's Museum. Four years later, in April 1935, she gave a somewhat different account of her marital history during an interview with Ruth McKenney. Barnell said she had been married three times: first at the age of 14, again at 19, and then to O'Boyle, to whom she had been married for four years.

After becoming a performer, Barnell had little contact with her family. She believed they regarded her as a disgrace because of her appearance and profession. By 1940, when she was 64, she told Joseph Mitchell that she had not seen her siblings for 22 years and assumed they were dead. She also recalled that one of her sisters had worked as a nurse caring for blind children in China.

== Death ==
Barnell died in Manhattan, New York City, on July 21, 1945, at the age of 69. Her remains were cremated by the New York and New Jersey Cremation Company.

For many years after her death, some published and online sources incorrectly reported that she had died on October 26, 1951, in Los Angeles, after confusing her with another woman, Susan Jane Barnell. During photographer Diane Arbus's later research into Barnell's life, Mitchell, who had interviewed Barnell in 1940, confirmed that she had in fact died in 1945.
