= Clémentine Delait =

French bearded lady

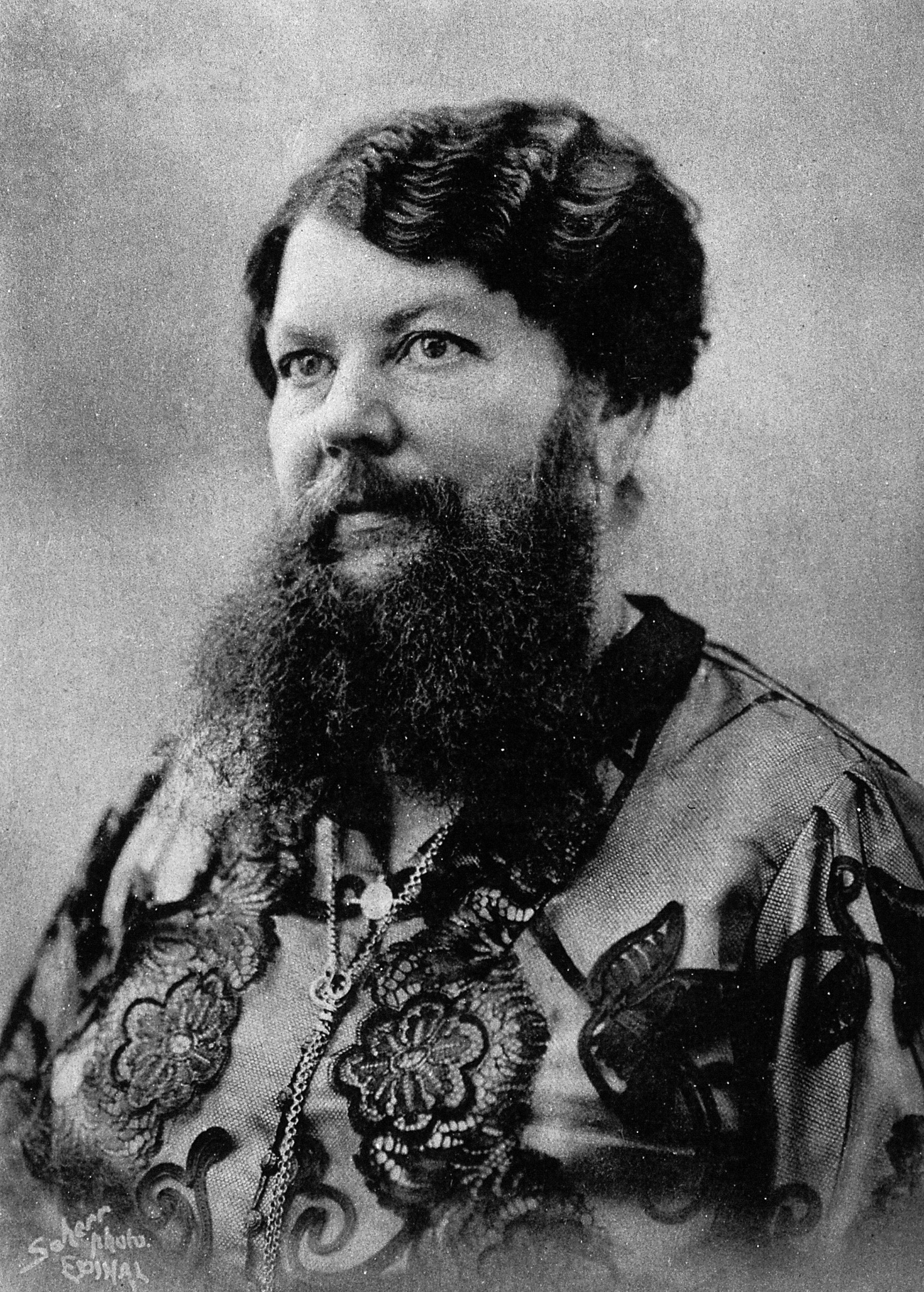
Clémentine Delait in 1923

Clémentine Delait (née Clattaux; 5 March 1865 – 5 April 1939) was a French café owner, entertainer and bearded lady. After allowing her beard to grow in 1900, she transformed her café in Thaon-les-Vosges into a popular attraction, selling souvenir postcards and becoming widely known in France during the early twentieth century.

Following the death of her husband in 1928, Delait devoted herself to touring, appearing in Paris, London, Belfast, Vienna, Berlin and Amsterdam, as well as in Africa and South America.

Delait became widely known for her carefully cultivated public image. She obtained official permission to wear men's clothing in 1904, posed for more than 70 promotional postcards in both masculine and feminine dress, and staged publicity events including entering a lion cage at a fair in Thaon-les-Vosges. Contemporary writers described her as "the most illustrious and celebrated bearded lady in France" and "the perfect example of a bearded lady".

A museum dedicated to Delait was established in Thaon-les-Vosges in the 1970s.

== Early life ==
Clémentine Delait was born Clémentine Clattaux on 5 March 1865 in Chaumousey, Lorraine, France. She was the youngest child of Joseph Marie Clattaux and Marie-Anne Géhin, with older siblings Marie and Auguste.

According to her memoirs, Delait began developing a beard at the age of 18 in 1883. She initially shaved regularly and continued to do so for many years.

== Marriage and family ==
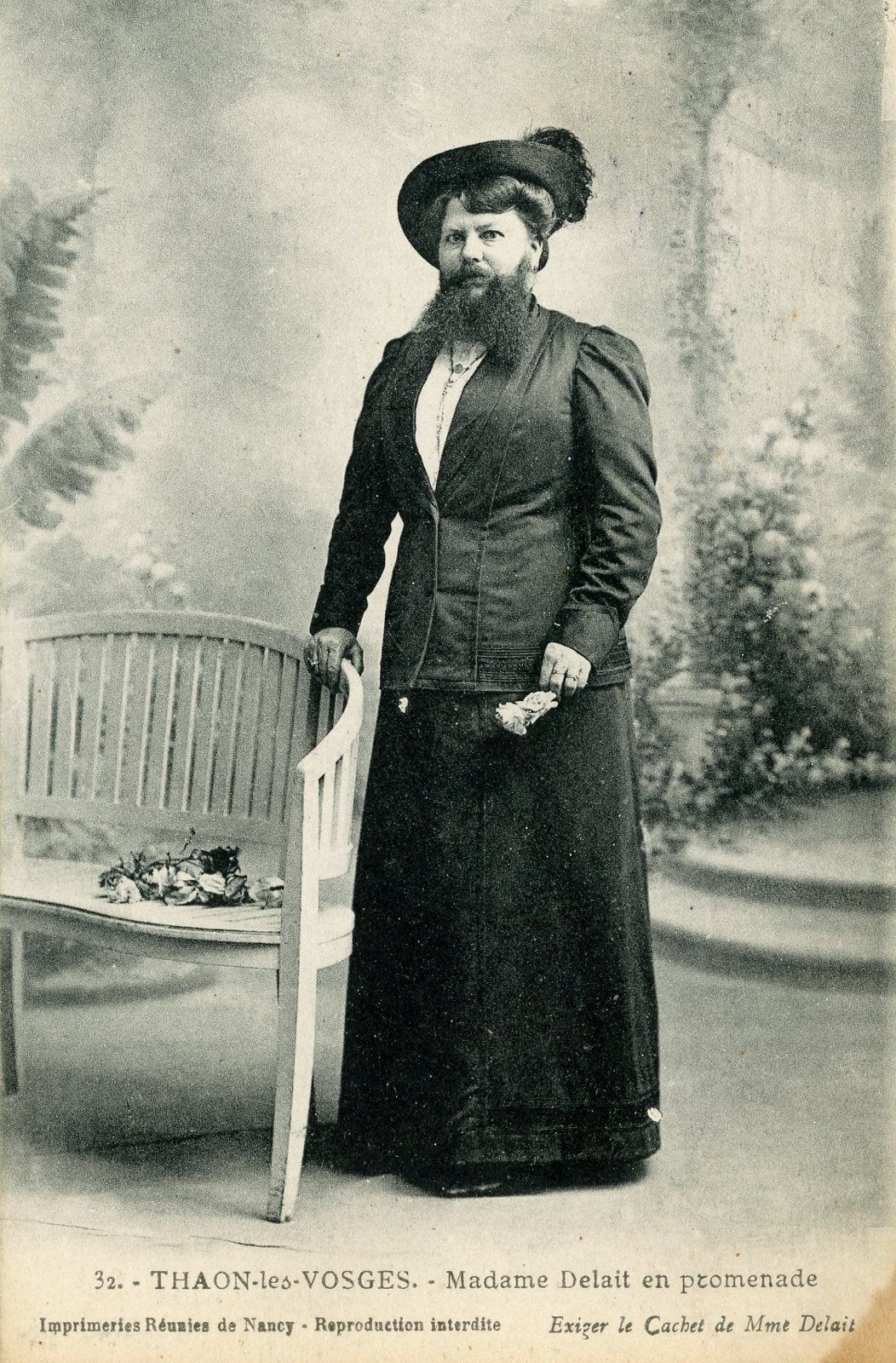
Souvenir postcard depicting Clémentine Delait in women's clothing.

On 25 September 1885, at the age of 20, Clémentine Clattaux married baker Paul Delait in nearby Thaon-les-Vosges. After their marriage, she worked alongside her husband in his bakery. Seven years later, in 1892, the couple opened a café in the town. After Delait stopped shaving her beard in 1900, the business became known as Le Café de la Femme à Barbe ("The Café of the Bearded Woman").

More than 30 years into their marriage, in 1919, the Delaits adopted a daughter, Fernande, whose parents had died during the Spanish flu pandemic.

At the age of 63, after more than 40 years of marriage, Delait became a widow when Paul Delait died in 1928. She subsequently devoted herself to touring, appearing in Paris, London, Belfast, Vienna, Berlin and Amsterdam, as well as in Africa and South America.

== Career ==
According to later accounts, Clémentine Delait was hirsute from an early age, but shaved regularly. This changed in 1900, when she visited a carnival and saw a bearded lady with an unimpressive stubble and boasted that she could grow a better beard herself. Her husband bet 500 francs to back her. The bet attracted many more customers to the Delaits' café and they changed the name to Le Café de La Femme à Barbe, "The café of the Bearded Woman".

Delait began selling photographs and postcards of herself and became something of a celebrity. She began touring Europe, attracting great crowds in Paris and London. Her touring intensified after she became a widow in 1926.

In 1903, Delait attracted widespread publicity at a fair in Thaon-les-Vosges when she entered a lion cage as part of a promotional stunt. Accompanied by the animal trainer Camilius, she spent several minutes among the lions before emerging unharmed, an event that drew considerable public attention.

After operating their café in Thaon-les-Vosges for more than three decades, the family sold it in 1923 and moved to Plombières-les-Bains, where Delait opened a shop selling embroidery, lace and lingerie while continuing to sell souvenir postcards.

== Appearance and public image ==
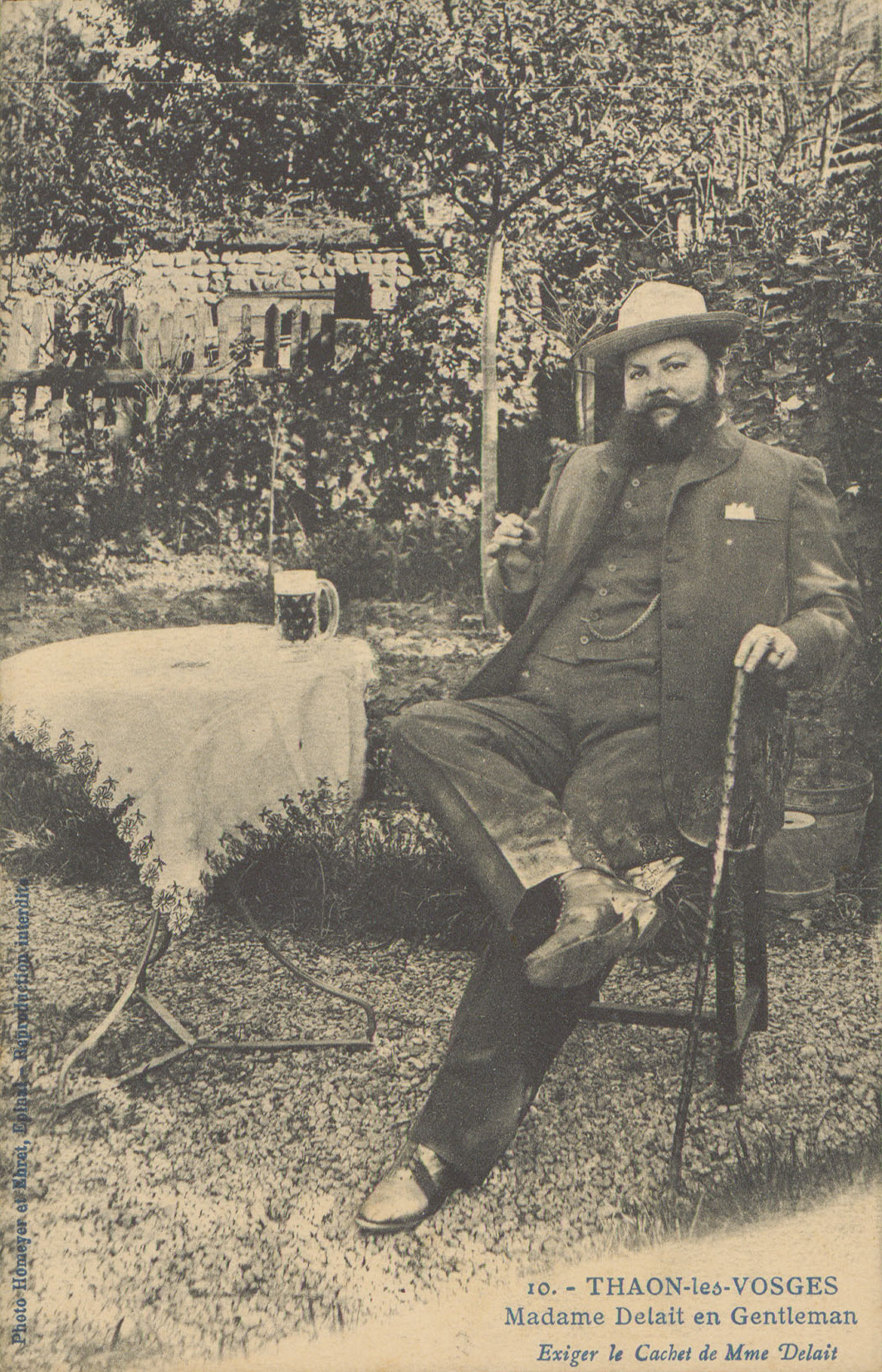
Souvenir postcard depicting Clémentine Delait dressed as a gentleman. More than 70 such postcards were produced and sold to promote her café and public appearances.

At the age of 35, on Pentecost Sunday in 1900, Delait decided to stop shaving and embraced her beard as a defining feature of her appearance. Four years later, in 1904, she obtained permission from the French authorities to wear men's clothing, at a time when French regulations generally prohibited women from doing so without authorization.

As her fame grew during the early 20th century, Delait posed for more than 70 souvenir postcards, which she signed and sold to promote her business. She was photographed wearing both men's and women's clothing, including elegant dresses, men's suits and a bowler hat, as well as riding a bicycle, driving a horse-drawn cart, posing with her dogs, and standing outside her café.

Those who knew Delait remarked on the care she devoted to her beard. Charles Grossier, her former barber, later recalled that she would "watch him like a hawk" whenever he trimmed it. Grossier visited her three times a week to wash her beard with a special shampoo and said that she brushed and groomed it every day.

== Death ==
In her later years, Delait developed rheumatism, which eventually forced her to retire from running her business and making public appearances.

Delait died after suffering a stroke on 5 April 1939, at the age of 74. She was buried in Thaon-les-Vosges, where she had spent most of her adult life. According to her memoirs, she wished to be remembered as "the Bearded Lady of Thaon", and those words were later inscribed on her gravestone.

== Legacy ==
In the 1970s, a museum dedicated to Clémentine Delait was opened in Thaon-les-Vosges.
