= Scudder's American Museum =

19th-century museum in New York

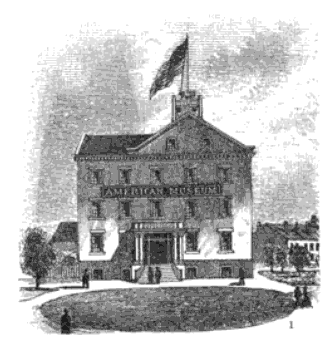
Scudder's American Museum circa 1825

Scudder's American Museum was a museum located in New York City from 1810 to 1841, when it was purchased by P.T. Barnum and transformed into the very successful Barnum's American Museum.

== Before Scudder ==
The roots of the museum date back to 1791, when the "American Museum" was founded by John Pintard "under the patronage of the Tammany Society." It was located at 57 King Street, with Pintard serving as secretary and Gardner Baker (more of a showman between the two) as keeper. The museum was moved to a building at the intersection of Pearl and Broad streets by 1794 called the "Exchange". It occupied a thirty-by-sixty foot room with a high ceiling, and later opened a second room including a menagerie.

It was called "Baker's American Museum" after Baker took control of it from the Tammany Society in 1795. Relying now only on ticket sales to finance operations, he raised admission prices and kept attempting to add new curiosities to draw visitors. After Baker died in 1798, and his widow died in 1800, the collection was purchased by William I. Waldron. It then came into the hands of painter Edward Savage, who opened the "Columbian Gallery of Painting and City Museum" in 1802, and hired John Scudder to oversee the museum collection.

== Scudder ==
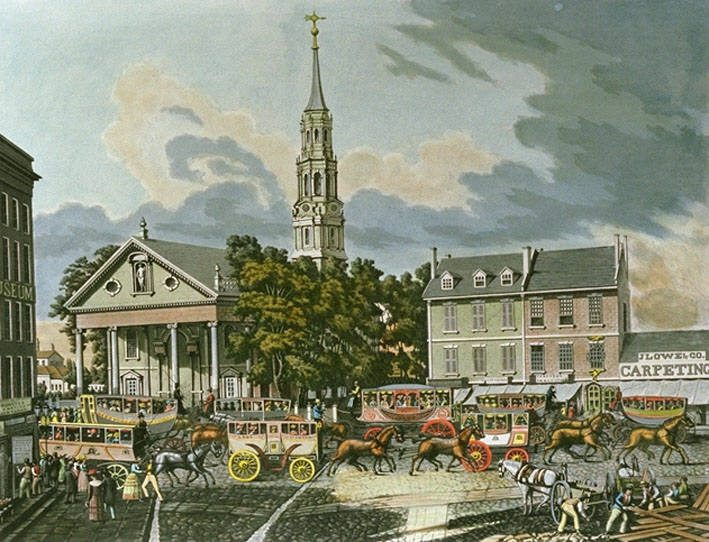
The leftmost part of this 1861 lithograph shows a part of Scudder's American Museum (the letters "Museum" can be made out) in 1831, in its final location across from St. Paul's

After earning money as a seaman, the collection became the property of John Scudder in 1809, and he opened "Scudder's American Museum" in March 1810 at 21 Chatham Street. The museum moved into part of the City's former poor house in 1817, along with other civic institutions. Poet Fitz-Greene Halleck referenced this social experiment in an 1819 satirical piece which includes the lines: "Once the old alms house, now a school of wisdom, Sacred to Scudder's shells and Dr. Griscom."

After Scudder died in August 1821, control of the museum fell to his heirs. Scudder's son (John Jr.) eventually became manager of the museum, and moved it into a five-story building on the corner of Broadway and Ann Street (across the street from St. Paul's Chapel) in December 1830. John Jr. was fired after family squabbles in 1831, and later brought back, but the family decided to sell the concern in 1841.

== Exhibits ==
The early collection from the Tammany years included an American bison, an 18-foot yellow snake of South American origin, a lamb with two-heads, wax figures, pieces of Indian, African, and Chinese origin. Baker also added a guillotine with beheaded wax figure.

In 1823, John Scudder, Jr. authored A Companion to The American Museum as a guide to its collection. By this stage (when the museum was located in the old poor house), the museum also had a forest scene in its large showroom with 80 stuffed animals and over 160 glass cases, with 600 specimens.

Alexis de Tocqueville and Gustave de Beaumont visited the museum in 1831. Expecting to see paintings, Beaumont wrote that instead they "laughed like the blessed" to see the sideshow-like contents such as a "magic lantern and some stuffed birds." The museum was at that time in the five-story building that was its final home, and had four halls. The first contained the stuffed birds, the second quadrupeds and fish, the third "miscellaneous curiosities", and the last was a "Grand Cosmorama, which contains Views of most of the principal cities of the world."

Holdings at the museum included the first American flag hoisted over New York City on the day the British departed in November 1783.
