= Bearded lady =

Woman with naturally occurring facial hair

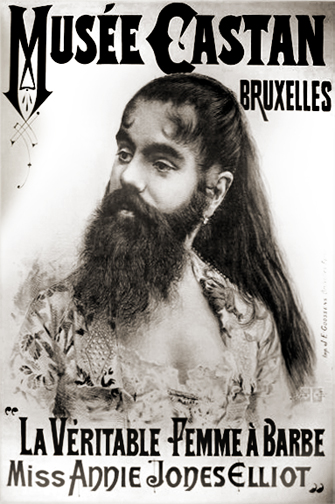
Annie Jones toured with P.T. Barnum's circus in the 19th century.

A bearded lady (or bearded woman) is a woman with a naturally occurring beard, normally due to a condition such as hirsutism or hypertrichosis. Hypertrichosis causes people of either sex to develop excess hair over their entire body (including the face), while hirsutism is restricted to females and only causes excessive hair growth in the nine body areas mentioned by Ferriman and Gallwey.

== Background ==
A relatively small number of women are able to grow enough facial hair to have a distinct beard. The condition is called hirsutism. It is usually the result of polyendocrine metabolic ovarian syndrome (PMOS) which causes excess testosterone, thus (to a greater or lesser extent) results in male pattern hair growth, among other symptoms. In some cases, female beard growth is the result of a hormonal imbalance (usually androgen excess), or a rare genetic disorder known as hypertrichosis. In some cases, a woman's ability to grow a beard can be due to hereditary reasons without anything medically being wrong.

There are numerous references to bearded women throughout the centuries, and William Shakespeare also mentioned them in Macbeth:

you should be Women,
And yet your beards forbid me to interpret,
That you are so.

— 138–46; 1.3. 37–45

However, no known productions of Macbeth included bearded witches.

== Race ==
Charles Darwin's ideas on sexual selection that influenced the perception of women with excess facial hair were applied differently across race. Women of color who had excess facial hair were actually perceived as evidence of human's evolution from apes, whereas white women with excess facial hair were perceived as diseased. A beard on a white woman challenged her sex and medical condition, whereas a beard on a woman of color challenged her species.

Some famous bearded women were Krao Farini and Julia Pastrana.

== Entertainment ==
Notable examples were the famous bearded ladies of the circus sideshows of the 19th and early 20th centuries, such as Barnum's Josephine Clofullia and Ringling Bros.' Jane Barnell, whose anomalies were celebrated. Sometimes circus and carnival freak shows presented bearded ladies who were actually women with facial hairpieces or bearded men dressed as women, both practices being lampooned by comedian and former circus performer W.C. Fields in the 1939 film, You Can't Cheat an Honest Man.

== Notable women with beards ==
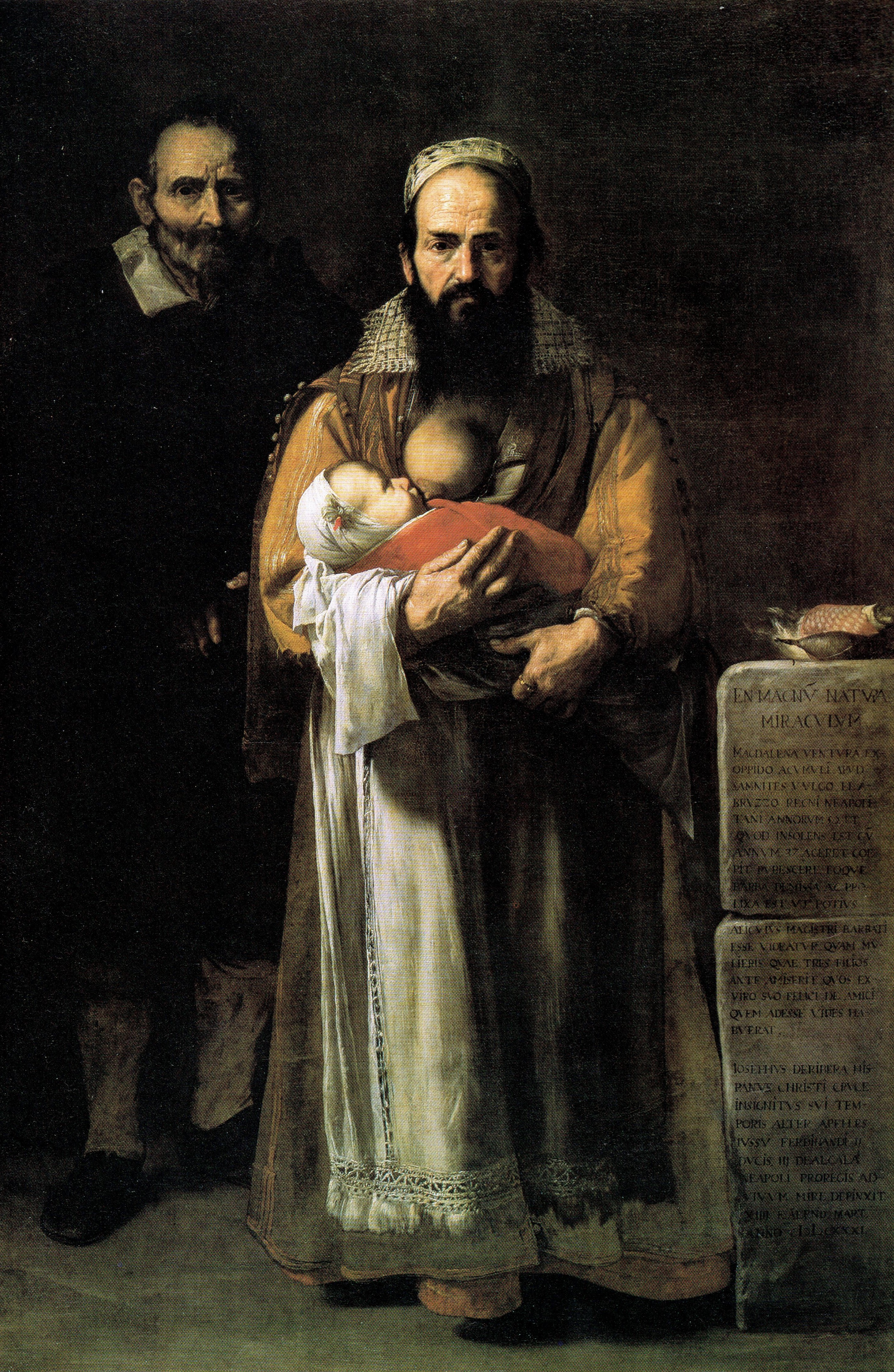
Magdalena Ventura with Her Husband and Son, portrait by Jusepe de Ribera (1631)

=== 8th century ===
- Iconography of the bearded Mary

=== 12th century ===
- Topographia Hibernica written by Gerald of Wales

=== 14th century ===
- Wilgefortis

=== 16th century ===
- Helena Antonia
- Brígida del Río, "the bearded woman of Peñaranda" (1590)

=== 17th century ===
- Magdalena Ventura, portrait by Jusepe de Ribera (1631)

=== 19th century ===
- Julia Pastrana
- Krao Farini
- Josephine Clofullia
- Annie Jones
- Alice Elizabeth Doherty ("The Minnesota Woolly Girl", 1887–1933)
- Sidonia de Barcsy (1866–1925)
- Madame Jane Devere (b. 1842)
- Grace Gilbert (1876–1924)

=== 20th century ===
- Clémentine Delait (late 19th century and early 20th century)
- Jane Barnell (late 19th century and early 20th century)
- Jennifer Miller
- Percilla Bejano

=== 21st century ===
- Harnaam Kaur

=== Popular culture ===
- Rosalie, Nadia Tereszkiewicz's character in Rosalie, loosely inspired by the life of Clémentine Delait.
- Ethal Darling, Kathy Bates's character in American Horror Story.
- Lettie Lutz, Keala Settle's character in The Greatest Showman.
- A fascination with Wilgefortis grips the narrator of Fifth Business, the 40th-best novel of the 20th century according to the Modern Library's readers' list.
- In the fictional country of Elbonia from the Dilbert comic strip, both men and women have beards and look identical.

== See also ==
- Saint Wilgefortis
- Ferriman–Gallwey score
