= Annie Jones (bearded woman) =

American sideshow performer

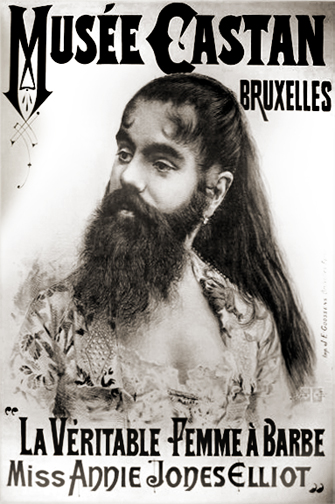
- A poster depicting Jones sometime in the fourteen years of her marriage to Richard Elliot
- Born: July 14, 1865; Marion, Virginia, US
- Died: October 22, 1902 (aged 37); Brooklyn, New York, US
- Known for: Bearded woman
- Spouses: Richard Elliot (m. 1881; div. 1895) William Donovan (m. 1896; died 1900)

Annie Jones Elliot (July 14, 1865 – October 22, 1902) was an American bearded woman, born in Virginia. She toured with showman P. T. Barnum as a circus attraction. Whether the cause of her condition was hirsutism or an unrelated genetic condition that affects children of both sexes and continues into adult years is unknown. Many photographers, including Mathew Brady, took her portraits during her lifetime, which were widely distributed. As an adult, Jones became the country's top "bearded lady" and acted as a spokesperson for Barnum's "Freaks", a word she tried to abolish from the business. Jones married Richard Elliot in 1881, but divorced him in 1895 for her childhood sweetheart William Donovan, who died, leaving Jones a widow. In 1902, Jones died in Brooklyn of tuberculosis.

== Biography ==
Annie Jones was born in Marion, Virginia, the county seat of Smyth County, in the southwestern end of the Commonwealth, on July 14, 1865. Photographer Mathew Brady took Jones' portrait as a child in 1865. A number of additional portraits were taken of Jones during her lifetime and were widely distributed.

When she was 16, Jones married a barker named Richard Elliot. They divorced 15 years later, and Jones subsequently married William Donovan, who worked in the show's wardrobe. They toured Europe, but then Donovan died a few years later and Jones re-joined Barnum's circus.

In an incident which may have been one of Barnum's publicity stunts, a New York phrenologist kidnapped Jones when she was a young child. Barnum and the police found her exhibited in a church fair. When the man claimed the child as his, the matter went to court. The judge had Jones separated from the others before it was her time to testify. When the child was taken to the courtroom, she went straight to her parents when she saw them. The judge declared the case closed.

== Career ==
Annie Jones photographed by Charles Eisenhmann

Jones entered show business at the age of nine months when she was exhibited by showman P. T. Barnum as the "Infant Esau". Barnum reportedly paid her parents $150 per week, and Jones remained in the circus industry for more than three decades. By the age of five, she had developed a mustache, sideburns, and beard and had become widely known as the "Bearded Girl".

During the late nineteenth century, Jones toured with Barnum's "Greatest Show on Earth", appearing in circus sideshows and dime museums across the United States. Although audiences were often drawn by her appearance, she worked to establish herself as a performer as well as an attraction as she disliked simply being stared at. Jones learned to play musical instruments and incorporated these skills into her act. She also emphasized her identity as a woman, challenging common assumptions about bearded women and other sideshow performers.

As an adult, Jones became one of the most successful and highly paid performers in the American sideshow industry. During her years with the Barnum & Bailey Circus, she spoke out against the use of the term "freak" to describe sideshow performers, arguing that it was dehumanizing and encouraged the public to view them as fundamentally different from other people. She advocated for the dignity and professional respect of sideshow performers.

== Death ==
After spending more than three decades in the circus industry, Jones fell ill with tuberculosis while visiting her mother in Brooklyn in 1902. She died there on October 22, 1902, at the age of 37.

Jones reportedly requested that she be buried with her beard intact.
