= Col. Wood's Museum =

Museum and public theatre in Chicago, Illinois

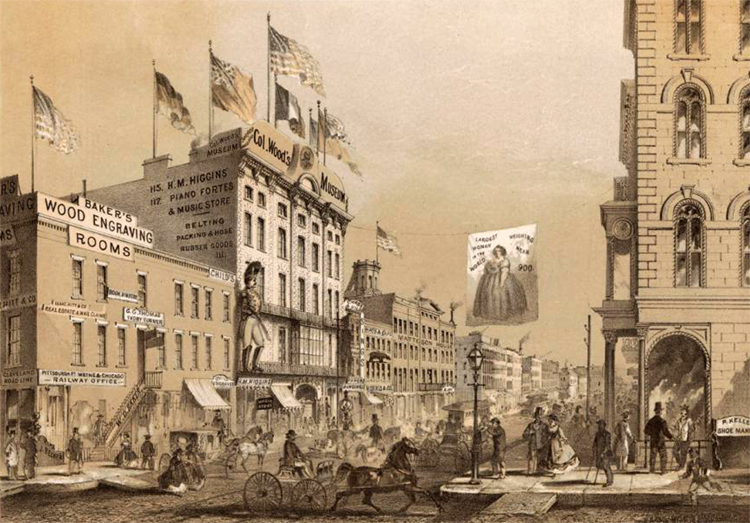
Col. Wood's Museum, as depicted by Louis Kurz in 1866.

Col. Wood's Museum (sometimes referred to simply as the Chicago Museum) was a museum and public theatre located in Chicago, Illinois. The museum was founded in 1864, but was destroyed by the Great Chicago Fire. A second incarnation opened in 1875, but it was also destroyed by fire. The final incarnation of the museum was opened in 1884. In addition to museum exhibits, the museum in its various iterations also included a theatre which presented plays to the public.

At one point, the museum housed a pair of mummies as well as sheets of papyri (which supposedly formed the basis for parts of the Book of Abraham) that had once belonged to Latter Day Saint movement founder Joseph Smith.

== History ==
The original version of the museum was founded by Col. John H. Wood and opened on March 22, 1864. The building was situated on the corner of Clark and Randolph Streets. According to Perry R. Duis, the museum was Chicago's version of Barnum's American Museum (which was located in New York City from 1841 until it burned in 1865). This incarnation of Wood's Museum contained a plethora of bizarre and interesting items that visitors could see for only a quarter, including: around sixty cases of birds, insects, and assorted reptiles; a panorama of London; many model ships; paintings of Indians; a rifle owned by Daniel Boone; a scale model of the Parthenon; the "Great Zeuglodon" (a 96-foot-long skeleton of a Basilosaurus); and a pair of mummies with sheets of papyri that had once belonged to Joseph Smith (founder of the Latter Day Saint movement).

Col. Wood's Museum burned to the ground during the Great Chicago Fire, and all of its contents were lost. Nevertheless, a week after the conflagration, Wood leased the Globe Theatre (which was located just outside the main downtown district) and began the long march towards reopening. After several years of preparations and collecting, Wood's museum was finally ready for visitors in 1875; this version too was stocked with bizarre finds, and Wood charged a quarter to visitors. The museum took up the second through fourth floors of the theater building. In 1877, this version was also destroyed by a fire, but Wood once again reopened it in 1884. He ran this final version out of the Olympia Theatre building, which he leased; a restaurant that had been operating on the main floor was retained, and Wood devoted the remaining four floors to showcasing novelties. The museum eventually increased its seating so that it could accommodate 1,000 people.

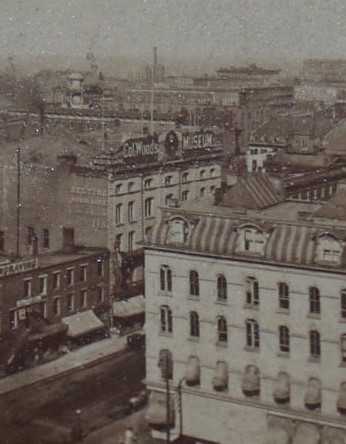
Col. Woods Museum before the fire

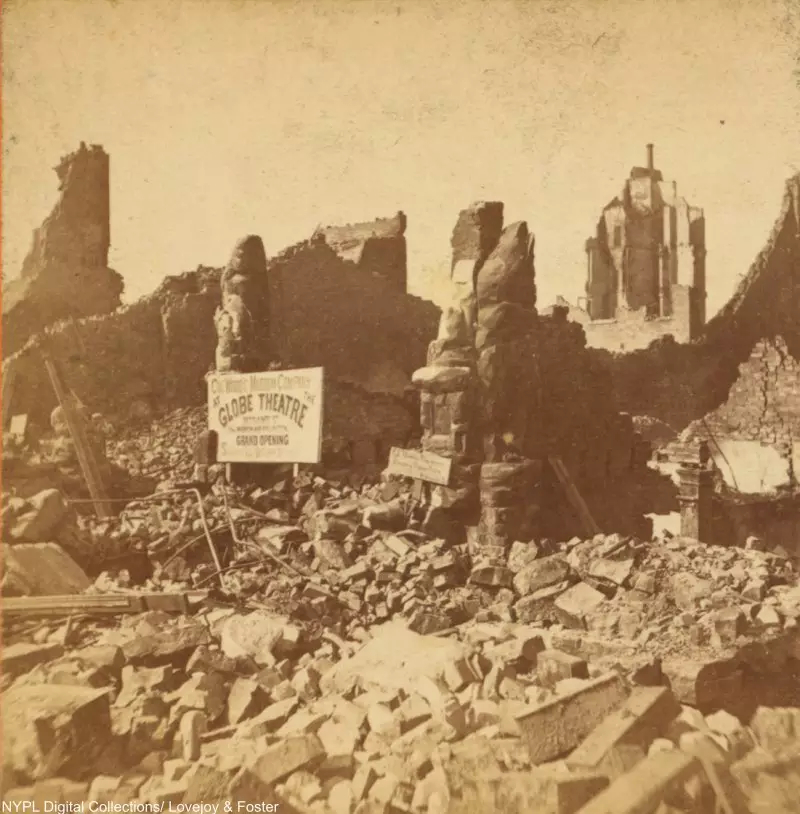
Col. Wood's Museum after the fire

== Bibliography ==
- Duis, Perry (1998). Challenging Chicago: Coping with Everyday Life, 1837–1920. Champaign: University of Illinois Press. ISBN 978-0-252-02394-1.
- Ritner, Robert K. (2013). The Joseph Smith Egyptian Papyri: A Complete Edition. Salt Lake City: Signature Books. ISBN 978-1-56085-220-9.
- Schiecke, Konrad (2011). Downtown Chicago's Historic Movie Theatres. Jefferson, NC: McFarland & Company. ISBN 978-0-7864-8865-0.
- Todd, Jay M. (January 1968). "Egyptian Papyri Rediscovered". Improvement Era. 71 (1): 12–16.
