= Bearded Mary =

Medieval iconography

The Bearded Mary is a rare type of image from medieval iconography (from the time of the Carolingian dynasty) in which Mary, the mother of Jesus, is depicted with a beard.

Caroline Walker Bynum and Jeffrey Schnapp link the tradition to the (earlier) medieval idea that sexually chaste women could become like men, detailed by JoAnn McNamara, and even grow a beard (according to an account repeated by Gregory the Great). According to Schnapp, the Carolingian image suggests female cross-dressing can be "viewed as a sign of spiritual advancement", celebrating "the martial heroism of female martyr-saints such as Perpetua, Catherine, and Joan of Arc".

== See also ==
- Wilgefortis – a fictitious female folk saint
