= Charles Eisenmann =

American photographer (1855–1927)

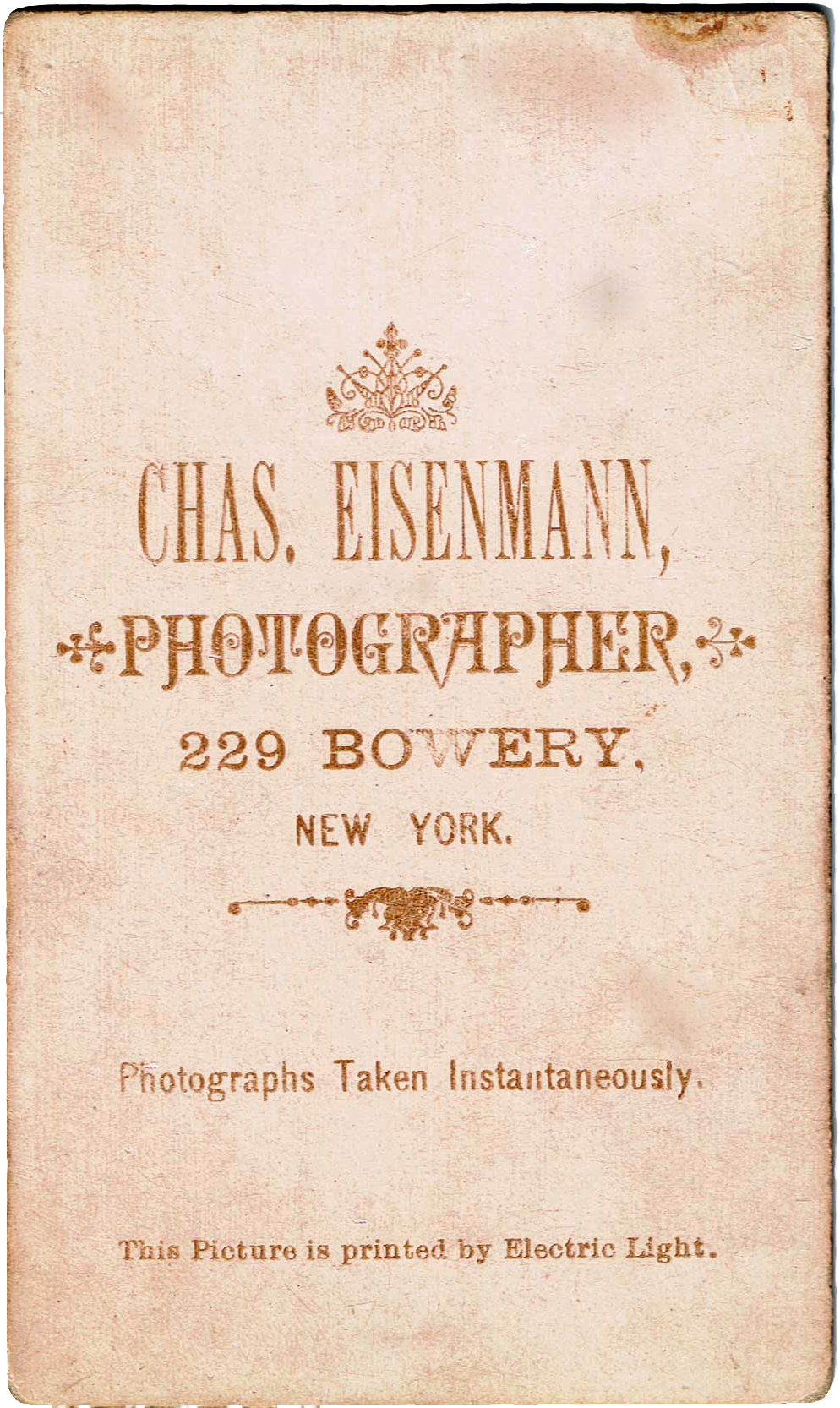
- Cabinet card of Eisenmann, verso
- Born: October 5, 1855; Germany
- Died: December 8, 1927 (aged 72)
- Education: W. W. Washburn in New Orleans
- Known for: Photography

Charles Eisenmann (October 5, 1855 – December 8, 1927) was a famous New York photographer during the late 1880s who worked in the Bowery district.

Eisenmann's photography was sold in the form of Cabinet cards, popular in this era, available to the middle class. Eisenmann also supplied Duke Tobacco Company with cheesecake photography to stuff in their tobacco cans. The book Victorian Cartes-de-Visite credits Eisenmann with being the most prolific and well known photographer when it comes to Cabinet cards.

His work was the subject of a 1979 monograph, Monsters of the Gilded Age, focusing on his work on human oddities from the Barnum and Bailey circus, with a notable widely circulated picture of Jojo the Dog-faced Boy. Although a number of his photographs were of obvious fakes (called "gaffed freaks"), many others were genuinely anomalous, including the giant Ruth Goshen, the four-legged girl Myrtle Corbin, and the Siamese twins Chang and Eng and Millie and Christine.

== Bowery district ==
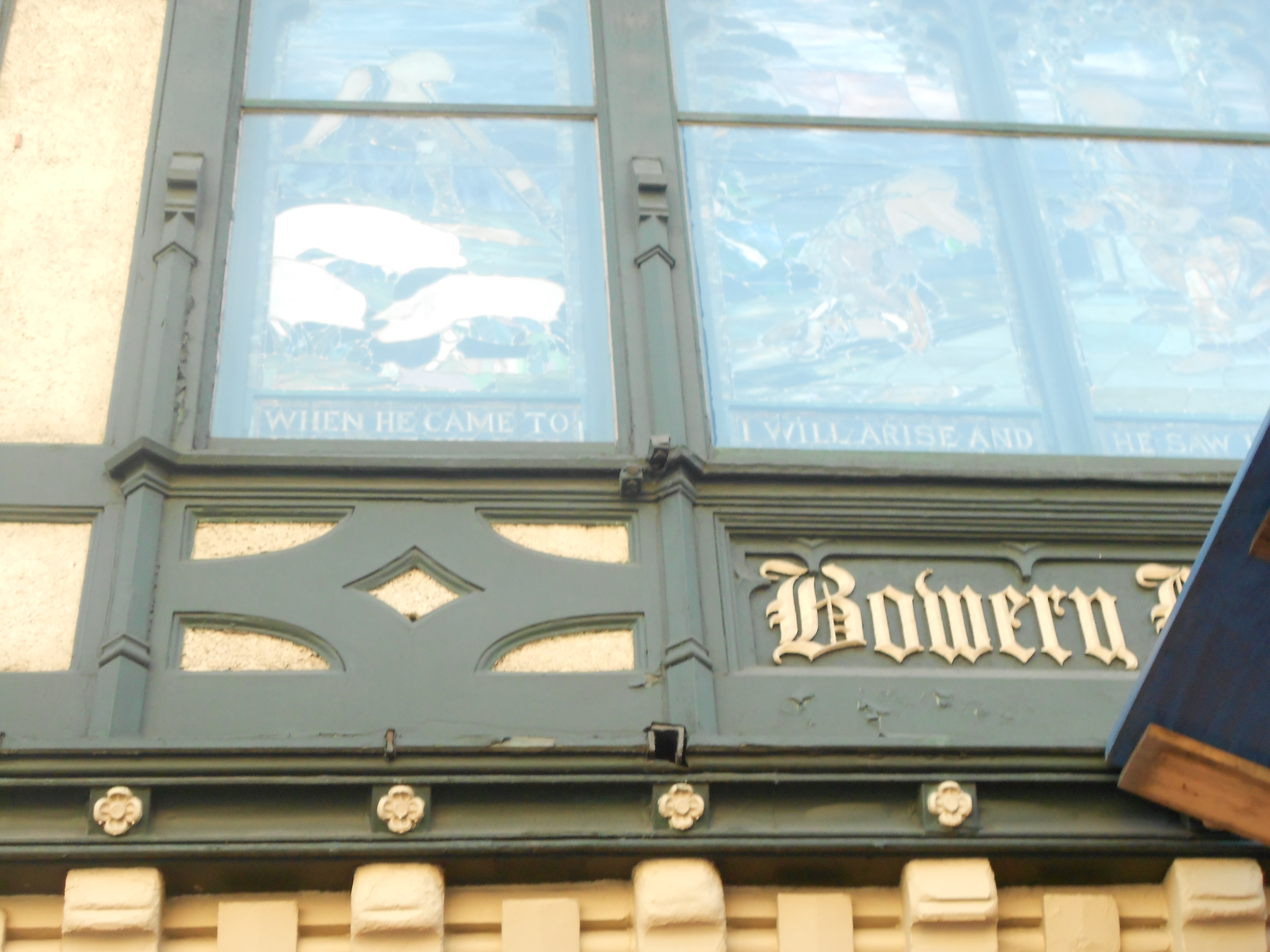
Bowery Mission now stands where Eisenmann's studio was

The address was 229 Bowery, which now is the home of a ministry and recently underwent a 3 million dollar renovation. At the time the Bowery district was an eclectic mix of artists, transient people and prostitutes. The depiction of this area in the movie Gangs of New York is judged by experts to be fairly accurate. The fallout of the New York City draft riots would have made for an era in New York that was unbridled and experimental: an ideal setting for unusual and cutting-edge photography.

== Humbugs ==
In his book, Secrets of the Sideshows, Joe Nickell points out that Eisenmann used a number of notable humbugs or gaffs. These included his "Circassian beauties", women with teased, large hairdos who were said to have escaped from Turkish harems. The models were locals from the Bronx with hair made frizzy and wild by washing in beer, who earned money for posing.

== Victorian society and circus freaks ==
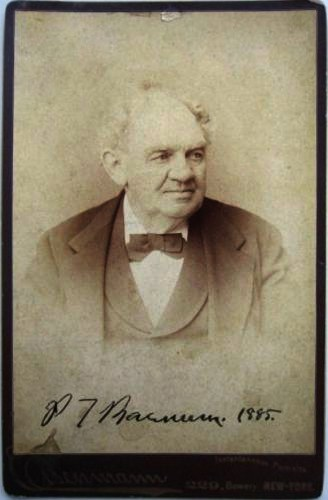
Photo of P. T. Barnum by Charles Eisenmann

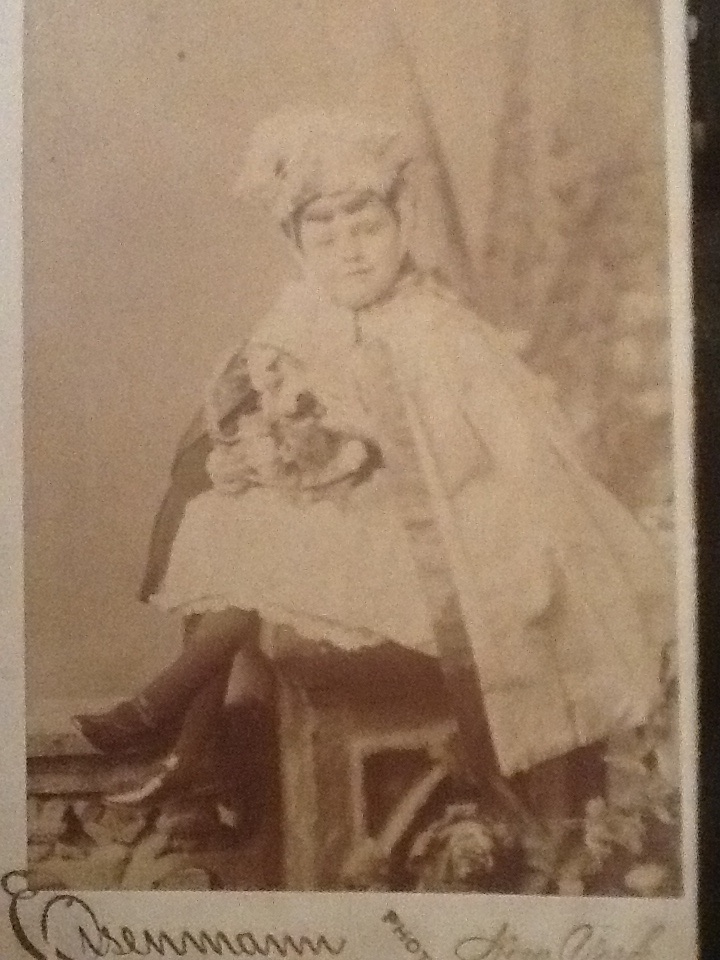
Photo of girl dressed in circus garb

In the late 1880s, A new phenomenon appeared with Victorian society's fascination and sympathy for people who appeared to have genetic abnormalities. There was much publicity, for example, over Princess Alexandra's attention to Joseph Merrick, the "Elephant Man."

Eisenmann saw the golden opportunity in this fascination, and photographed circus people dressed as Victorian society, and conversely Victorian society with circus props. In New York city circus people were quite well received, as evidenced by the proliferation of dime museums and the PT Barnum circus located in New York.

One of Eisenmann's subjects, Charles Stratton (Major Tom Thumb) was quite well known, and his wedding was quite the affair. "The couple’s elaborate wedding took place in Grace Episcopal Church in New York City. The Astors and the Vanderbilts were said to have attended as Barnum sold tickets for $75."

Other prestigious clients included Mark Twain, and Annie Oakley. In some ways Eisenmann can be considered a kind of Annie Leibovitz of the Victorian Bowery district. His career suffered a downturn with the introduction of Gelatin silver process photography which made photographs more inexpensive and available for mass consumption. Also, Vaudeville overtook circuses in popularity at this time as well. In 1898 Eisenmann closed his studio and was succeeded by Frank Wendt. Frank was a sort of intern of his. For a few years, he sold photographic equipment and took conventional portraits in Plainfield, New Jersey but by 1907 he had disappeared from the public record, some believing he went to Germany. This was the second time he went off the radar, the first time being when his first wife died. At that time he was believed to have gone to Asia.

Eventually, in the early 1900s, he resurfaced as the head of the photography department for DuPont taking pictures of employees. He died in 1927.

A collection of his photographs was auctioned off through Sotheby's in 1991, with an estimated price of between $15,000 and $25,000 for the large collection.

== In popular culture ==
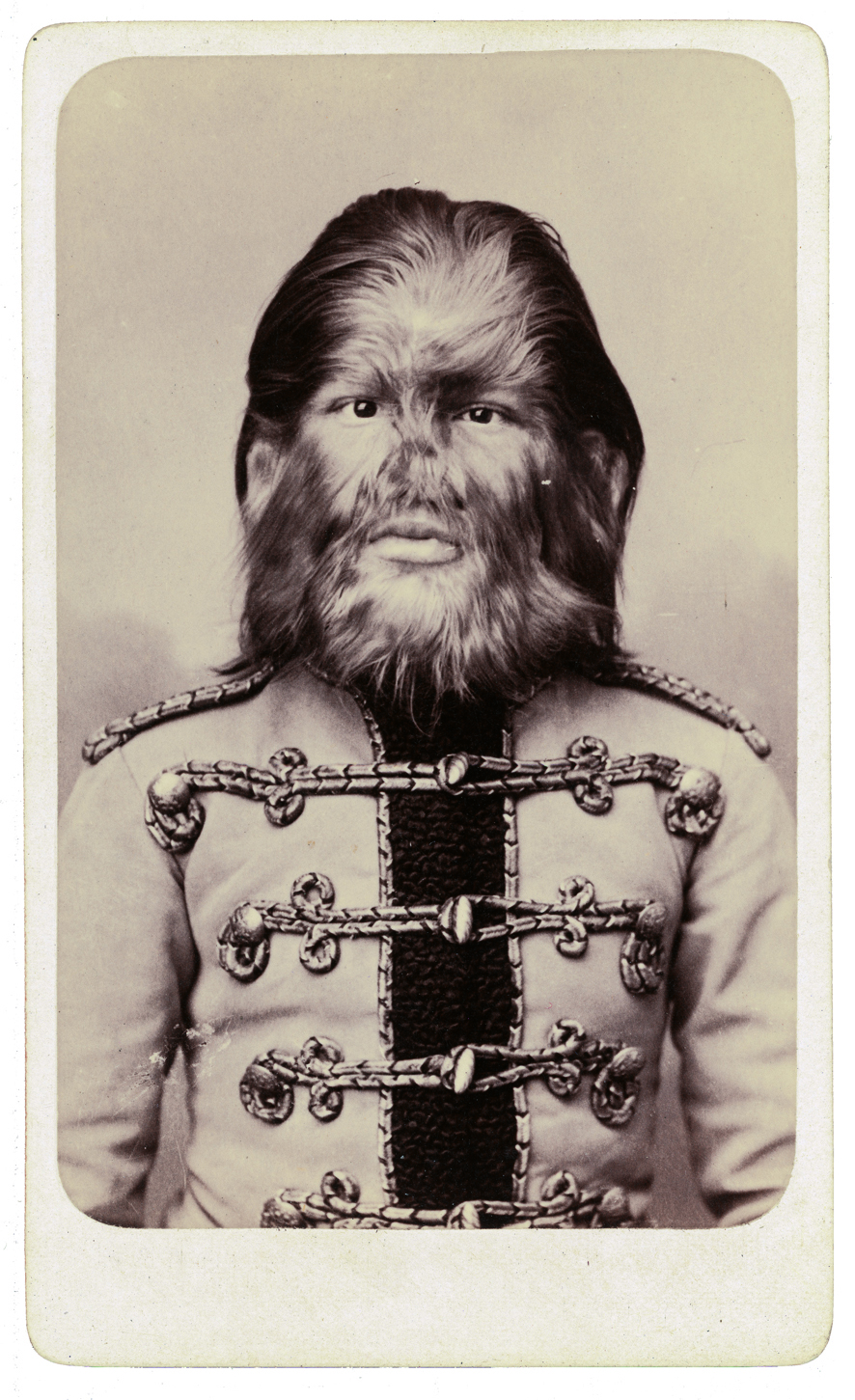
A portrait of Jeftichew taken by Charles Eisenmann

A number of Eisenmann's favorite subjects can be seen depicted in The X-Files episode "Humbug", namely Jojo the Dog-faced Boy and Chang and Eng Bunker.

== Contribution to medicine ==
A number of Eisenmann's pictures have been catalogued for their depiction of a number of mutations and abnormalities.
