= Krao Farini =

American sideshow performer with hypertrichosis

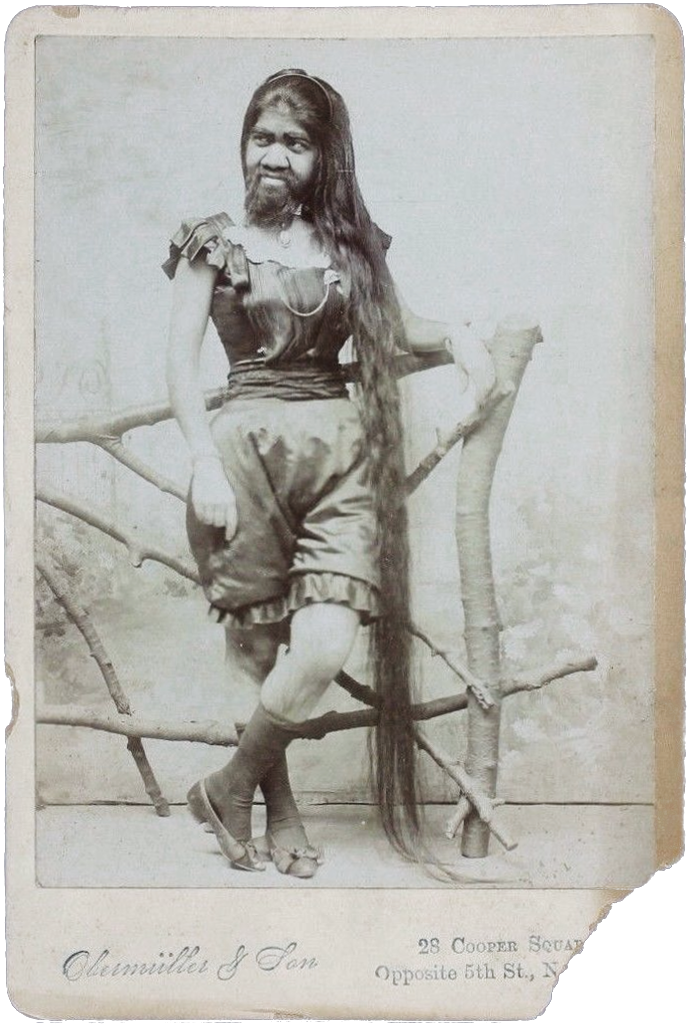
- Born: 1876; Laos, Rattanakosin Kingdom
- Died: April 16, 1926 (aged 49–50); Brooklyn, New York, US
- Other name: The Missing Link

Krao Farini (1876 – 16 April 1926) was a sideshow performer born in what is now Laos, then part of the northern Rattanakosin Kingdom, with hypertrichosis, a rare condition characterized by excessive hair growth. After being taken from Southeast Asia as a child, she was adopted by the Canadian-born showman William Leonard Hunt, known professionally as Guillermo Antonio Farini, who exhibited her throughout North America and Europe.

Farini was promoted as the "Missing Link" between humans and apes, reflecting nineteenth-century ideas about evolution, race, and human origins rather than scientific evidence. Although contemporary publicity portrayed her as a member of a previously unknown forest-dwelling community, modern writers have described these claims as part of the fictional narrative used to market her exhibitions.

Farini spent more than forty years performing in museums, circuses, and travelling shows, including the Barnum & Bailey Circus and the Ringling Bros. and Barnum & Bailey Circus. At her death in 1926, fellow performers remembered her as "the best-liked of freaks" and "the peacemaker of the side show".

== Early life ==
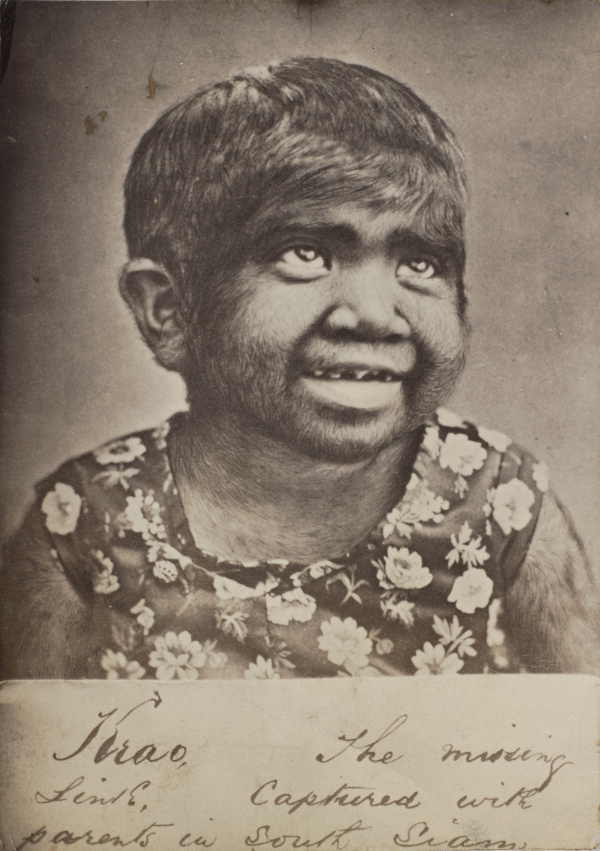
Krao Farini as a child in a promotional photograph, c. 1880s.

Much of what is known about Krao Farini's early life comes from accounts published during her exhibition career, making it difficult to distinguish documented facts from promotional stories.

According to contemporary sources, Farini was born in 1876 in what is now Laos, then part of the northern Rattanakosin Kingdom. When she was about five years old, she was reportedly taken from Southeast Asia during an expedition led by the Norwegian explorer Carl Bock.

Accounts published during her exhibition career claimed that Farini belonged to a previously unknown forest-dwelling community. Modern writers have noted that such stories later became part of the narrative used to promote her as a "missing link" between humans and apes.

Contemporary reports stated that Farini was separated from her parents following the expedition. Her father was reported to have died of cholera at Chiang Mai, while her mother remained in Southeast Asia.

Farini was subsequently taken to Europe, where she came under the care of physician and anthropologist Dr. George Shelly and was later adopted by the Canadian-born showman William Leonard Hunt, known professionally as Guillermo Antonio Farini.

== Medical condition ==
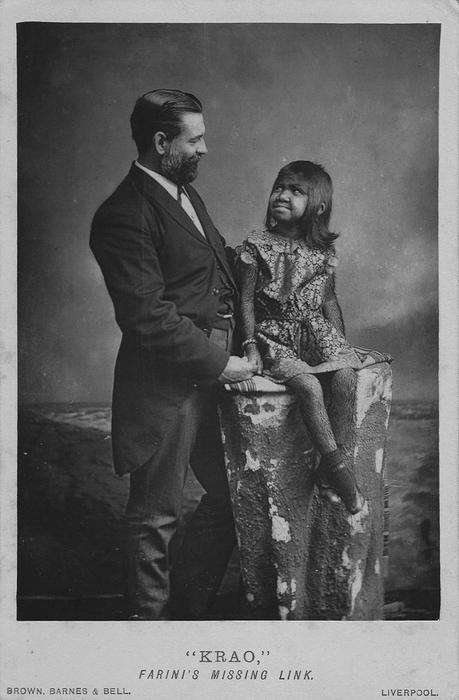
Krao Farini as a child with her manager and adoptive father, Guillermo Antonio Farini, in a promotional photograph.

Farini was born with hypertrichosis, a rare condition characterized by excessive hair growth. As a child, her face was described as being covered with long hair, including a beard and thick eyebrows, while finer hair covered much of the rest of her body.

During her exhibition career, Farini's condition was frequently interpreted through the lens of contemporary debates about human evolution. Showman William Leonard Hunt, known professionally as Guillermo Antonio Farini, promoted her as a "missing link" between humans and apes and as evidence supporting the theories of Charles Darwin. Modern accounts have described these claims as reflecting nineteenth-century ideas about evolution, race, and human development rather than evidence that Krao belonged to a distinct human group.

Contemporary reports also attributed a number of unusual anatomical features to Farini in addition to her body hair, including an additional thoracic vertebra, an extra pair of ribs, cheek pouches, unusually flexible joints, and reduced cartilage in parts of the ears and nose.

== Career ==
Farini arrived in London in October 1882 after being brought to Europe by anthropologist Dr. George Shelly and the Norwegian explorer Carl Bock. She was subsequently exhibited by the showman William Leonard Hunt, known professionally as Guillermo Antonio Farini. While appearing at the Royal Aquarium in Westminster, Krao learned German and some English. Following her adoption by Farini, she became known professionally as Krao Farini.

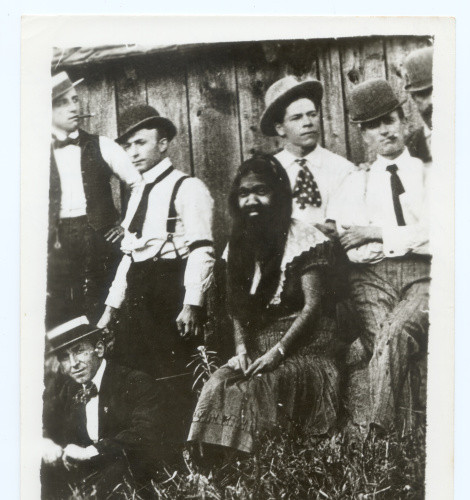
Krao Farini with unidentified men in an undated photograph, probably taken during her exhibition career in the 1890s.

By the time Farini arrived in Philadelphia in November 1884 to begin her American career in a dime museum, contemporary accounts described her as only eight or nine years old and still under the care of Dr. George Shelly.

Over the following decades, Farini exhibited throughout North America and Europe. In 1899, she toured the British Isles, including appearances in Cardiff and Edinburgh. During the late nineteenth and early twentieth centuries, she spent many years with the Barnum & Bailey Circus and later the Ringling Bros. and Barnum & Bailey Circus. A 1924 photograph of the Ringling Brothers' "Congress of Freaks" shows her still performing near the end of her life.

At her death in 1926, fellow performers remembered Farini as "the best-liked of freaks" and "the peacemaker of the side show". At her funeral, the Reverend Augustus Steimle of the Church of the Advent stated that she had mastered several languages and was familiar with the literature of many cultures.

Although Farini spent much of her life performing before the public, she reportedly disliked being stared at away from the circus. When travelling through city streets, she often wore a veil to avoid unwanted attention.

== Death ==
In the last years of her life, Farini lived at 309 East Nineteenth Street in Brooklyn, New York City. She died from influenza in Manhattan on 16 April 1926, at about 50 years of age. Before her death, she requested that her body be cremated to prevent her remains from being publicly exhibited or gawked at after her death.

== See also ==
- Alice Elizabeth Doherty, "The Minnesota Woolly Girl"
- Annie Jones, "The Bearded Woman"
- Julia Pastrana, "Bear Woman", "The Apewoman", "The Nondescript"
- Human zoos
