= Stephan Bibrowski =

Sideshow performer (1890-1932)

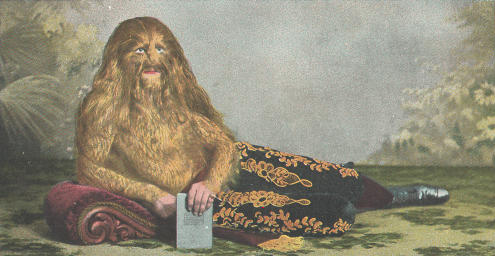
- Lionel the Lion-faced Man at the age of 17 (1907)
- Born: 1890; Wilczogóra, Congress Poland
- Died: 1932 (aged 41); Berlin, Weimar Republic

Stephan Bibrowski (1890–1932), better known as Lionel the Lion-faced Man, was a famous sideshow performer. His whole body was covered with long hair that gave him the appearance of a lion; this was likely due to a rare condition called hypertrichosis.

== Biography ==
Bibrowski was born in 1890 in Wilczagówa in Congress Poland with 2.5 cm (1 in) of hair covering his body. His mother, Benedetta, blamed the condition on the mauling of his father, Michael, by a lion, which she said she witnessed while pregnant with Stephan. She considered Stephan an abomination and gave him up to a German impresario named Sedlmayer when he was about four years old. Sedlmayer gave him his stage name and started exhibiting him around Europe.

By the time he was put on exhibit, Lionel's hair had grown to 20 cm (8 in) on his face and hung about 10 cm (4 in) everywhere else. His body was almost entirely covered with hair, except for his palms and soles. In 1901, Lionel traveled to the United States and started appearing with the Barnum and Bailey Circus. He toured with the circus from then on, occasionally going back to Europe.

In his act, Lionel performed gymnastic tricks, and also spoke to people to show his gentle side that sharply contrasted with his appearance of a lion. He settled in the U.S. in 1920, becoming a popular attraction, and moved to New York City, where he was a fixture at Coney Island.

By the late 1920s, Lionel retired from his sideshow career and moved back to Germany. He was reported to have died in Berlin from a heart attack in 1932 at the age of 41.
