= William Leonard Hunt =

19th-century Canadian entertainer

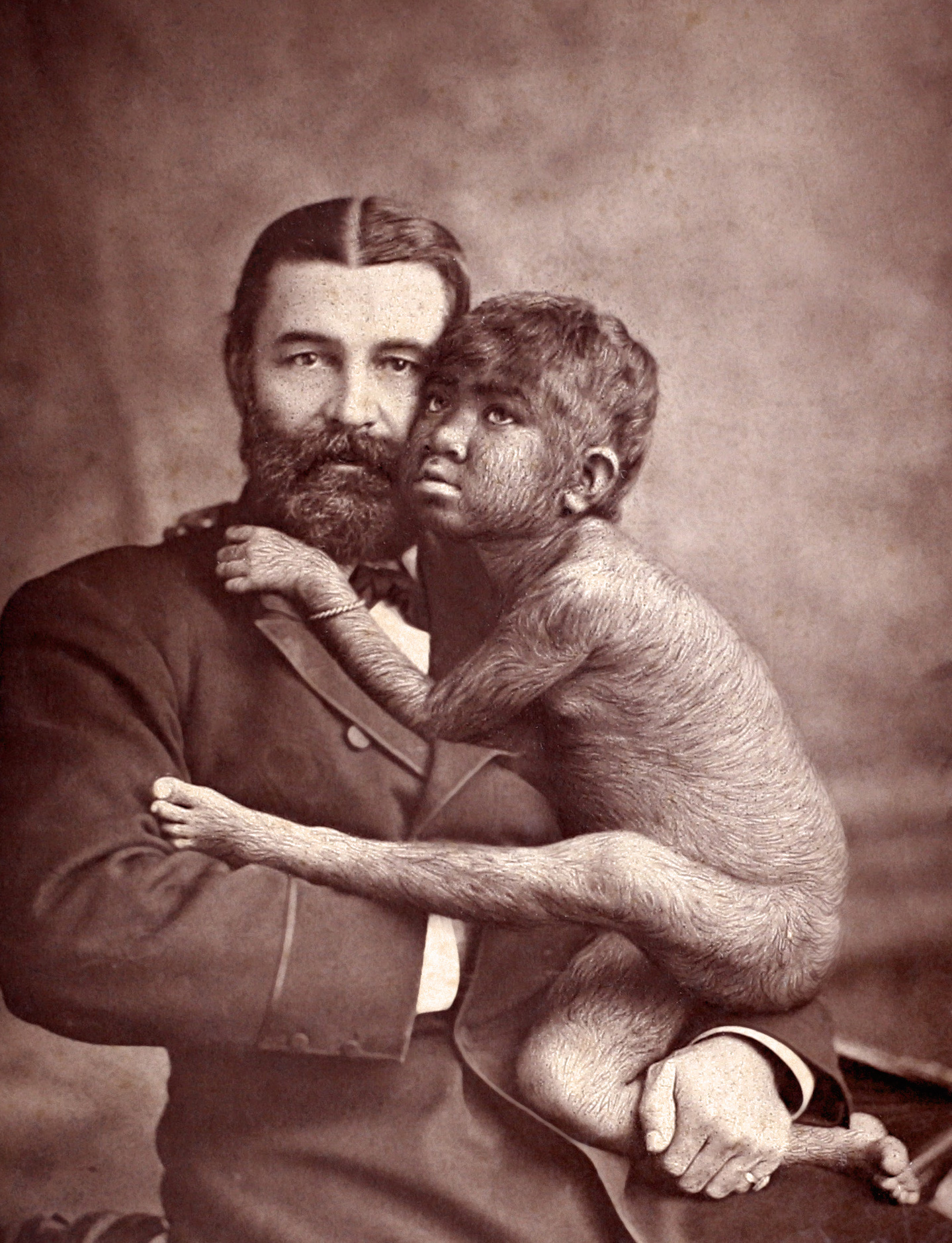
- Hunt with Krao Farini, 1883
- Born: June 10, 1838; Lockport, New York
- Died: January 17, 1929 (aged 90); Port Hope, Ontario
- Other names: The Great Farini; Guillermo Antonio Farini; Signor Farini; Enrico Farino; The Athlete of the World
- Occupation: Entertainment promoter

William Leonard Hunt (June 10, 1838 – January 17, 1929), also known by the stage name The Great Farini, was a well-known nineteenth- and early twentieth-century Canadian funambulist, entertainment promoter and inventor, as well as the first known white man to cross the Kalahari Desert on foot and survive. He also published under the name Guillermo Antonio Farini.

== Early life ==
Hunt, the second child of Thomas William Hunt and Hannah Soper, was born in Lockport, New York. His parents were strict disciplinarians, but their punishments had little effect on him; as he later recalled, he "took pleasure in disobeying their commands." For example, he loved swimming and had an uncommon ability for it. Of his frequent excursions, many of them would be to go swimming. His mother soon forbade him to and sewed up the collars and sleeves of his clothes so that he could not strip for swimming, but that did not stop him; he would just swim with his clothes on and run in the sun until he was dry or rip open his clothes and get some older girls to sew them up for him again.

In 1843, Hunt's family moved to Hope Township in Canada, now part of Port Hope, Ontario, and then to Bowmanville, Ontario. While in Bowmanville, Hunt snuck into a circus that had come to town, and became infatuated with show business. He began developing his muscles and acrobatic talent in secret and became very proficient. Soon, he had an idea. He decided to host his own circus in town. It was quite successful, complete with music and various circus entertainment, and he found himself with $6 in his hat, but it ended in catastrophe. Just about when it was going to end, a bunch of angry parents came storming in, including Willie's father. He claimed that young William had disgraced the whole family and started whipping him, but this just increased Willie's determination. Hunt was apprenticed to a doctor as a young adult.

On October 1, 1859, he undertook his first professional high wire performance, above the Ganaraska River in Port Hope during the Durham County Agricultural Fair, calling himself Signor Farini (after Luigi Carlo Farini). It was a resounding success, and he followed it up six days later with a show of strength in the town hall. He began issuing tightrope challenges to Charles Blondin, the preeminent tightrope walker.

After his hometown debut, Farini began performing at several fairs in Ontario. He joined Dan Rice's Floating Circus and performed at various places on the Mississippi River as a tightrope walker and strongman. In the spring of 1860, he returned to Ontario and made additional challenges to Blondin.

== Niagara Falls ==
The Great Farini made his most famous tightrope performances at Niagara Falls during 1860, commencing on August 15, trying to one-up Blondin, who had been the first to cross the Falls on a tightrope. Farini's feats included crossing a high wire with a man on his back or with a sack over his entire body, turning somersaults while on the rope, hanging from it by his feet, and other seemingly impossible manoeuvres. During this time, he was often in competition with fellow tightrope walker Blondin. On one occasion, Blondin performed before the Prince of Wales (the future King Edward VII) during his visit to the falls, but the future monarch snubbed Farini's performance. Farini toured the United States in the winter of 1860 and returned to Niagara Falls the next year, but the American Civil War had put an end to the crowds he had once drawn. He married in 1861.

== American Civil War ==
Farini joined the Union Army as a member of the Engineers Regiment. He later claimed to have served as a spy. During the war, he designed a rope bridge that could be easily put up and a pair of pontoon shoes designed to allow a person to walk on water. The latter, he claimed to have demonstrated before Abraham Lincoln. It is unknown what brought an end to his military service. On December 6, 1862, Farini was performing at the Plaza Torres Bullring in Havana, Cuba with his wife. During their tightrope performance, he was carrying his wife on his shoulders and had almost completed his performance. She lost her balance, he tried to grab a hold of the skirt of her dress, and then he lost his grip. She fell sixty feet into the crowd and died days later. He toured South America before returning to the United States in 1864. In August 1864, he attempted to walk across the American Falls on stilts. A stilt got stuck, he lost his balance, and he had to be rescued. He successfully performed the same feat across Chaudière Falls.

== Career abroad ==
Beginning in 1866, Farini performed with his adopted son, Sam ("El Niño Farini") in London as the acrobatic act: "Signor Farini and son, the Flying Wonders" at the Cremorne Gardens and the Alhambra Theatre. He quickly became a legend, and was one of the most celebrated acrobats and trapeze artists in Europe. By 1877 his adopted son, Samuel Wasgate, was replaced by a female acrobat with the stage name "Lulu". Lulu was in fact Wasgate with long hair and makeup dressed as a woman. Lulu Farini also achieved great fame as an acrobat even after his gender was publicly revealed by 1876. Lulu reverted to male appearance, but kept his name. He married Hunt's daughter.

Farini ended his acrobatic career in 1869, fearing that if he continued he would eventually be seriously injured. However, he remained in show business, becoming a trainer and manager of acrobats, as well as an inventor. Circus historians credit him with the invention of the first apparatus in 1876 for what became known as the now famous "human cannonball" act. Although Hunt's son "Lulu" first used it for an act called "Lulu's Leap" since 1873, the performance in London in 1877 by 14-year-old "Zazel" (Rossa Matilda Richter) credited her as being the first "human cannonball".

In 1871, he married an English woman named Alice Carpenter. They had two children together. The Farinis separated in 1878 and divorced very publicly in 1880.

In March 1881, Farini returned to the United States from London with costumes from all over the world and planned to form a massive circus with William C. Coup. By 1882, he was arranging many of the entertainments at the Royal Aquarium in London. The heavily tattooed Captain George Costentenus was among the acts he exhibited at the Royal Aquarium. In the early 1880s, he adopted the Laotian girl Krao Farini and exhibited her as the Missing Link. The explorer Carl Bock had found her while on expedition that Farini had financed. For the next few years he came up with many such acts, even partnering with the legendary P.T. Barnum for some time, before he left for Africa in January 1885.

== Kalahari expedition ==
Farini purportedly overcame many obstacles when he traversed the Kalahari Desert on foot during his stay in Africa, allegedly becoming among the first white men to survive the crossing. His adoptive son Lulu Farini was also travelling with him and made sketches and photographs of what they found. He also claimed to have found the famous Lost City of the Kalahari, but his claims have never been verified. He returned to England in August 1885 with many botanical and human samples. He published a book about his experiences in 1886. National Archives UK has a collection of Lulu's photographs online.

== Life as a promoter, horticulturalist, inventor, and artist ==
In January 1886, Farini married a German concert pianist named Anna Müller. She was the daughter of the German Aide-de-camp and a cousin to Richard Wagner.

For the next few years, Farini became focused on promoting various acts including Thomas Scott Baldwin parachute jump from a balloon in 1888 at Alexandra Palace, Lily Langtry, Eugen Sandow, Fred Karno, and Vesta Tilley. In 1890, Farini retired to Forest Hill, London. He began to focus on flower horticulture and inventing. In 1899, the Farinis left England and settled in Toronto, Ontario, Canada. In the early 1900s, he took up painting and sculpting.

In 1909, the Farinis moved to Germany. While in Germany, he worked as translator and also wrote a thirty volume history of World War I that focused upon the German perspective of the war. They returned to North America in 1920. They lived in several places in New York and Ontario during the next few years before settling at Port Hope, Ontario. Farini died of influenza on January 17, 1929, in Port Hope, Ontario. His wife died in 1931

After his death, his papers, artifacts, and photographs became part of the collection of the Archives of Ontario. In 1995, a biography was written about Farini by Shane Peacock.

== Works ==
- Guillermo Antonio Farini. Through the Kalahari Desert: A Narrative of a Journey with Gun, Camera, and Note-book to Lake N'Gami and Back. 1886.
- Guillermo Antonio Farini. How to Grow Begonias. 1897.
- Guillermo Antonio Farini. 30 volume unpublished history of World War I. 1910s to 1920s.
