= Captain George Costentenus =

19th century circus performer

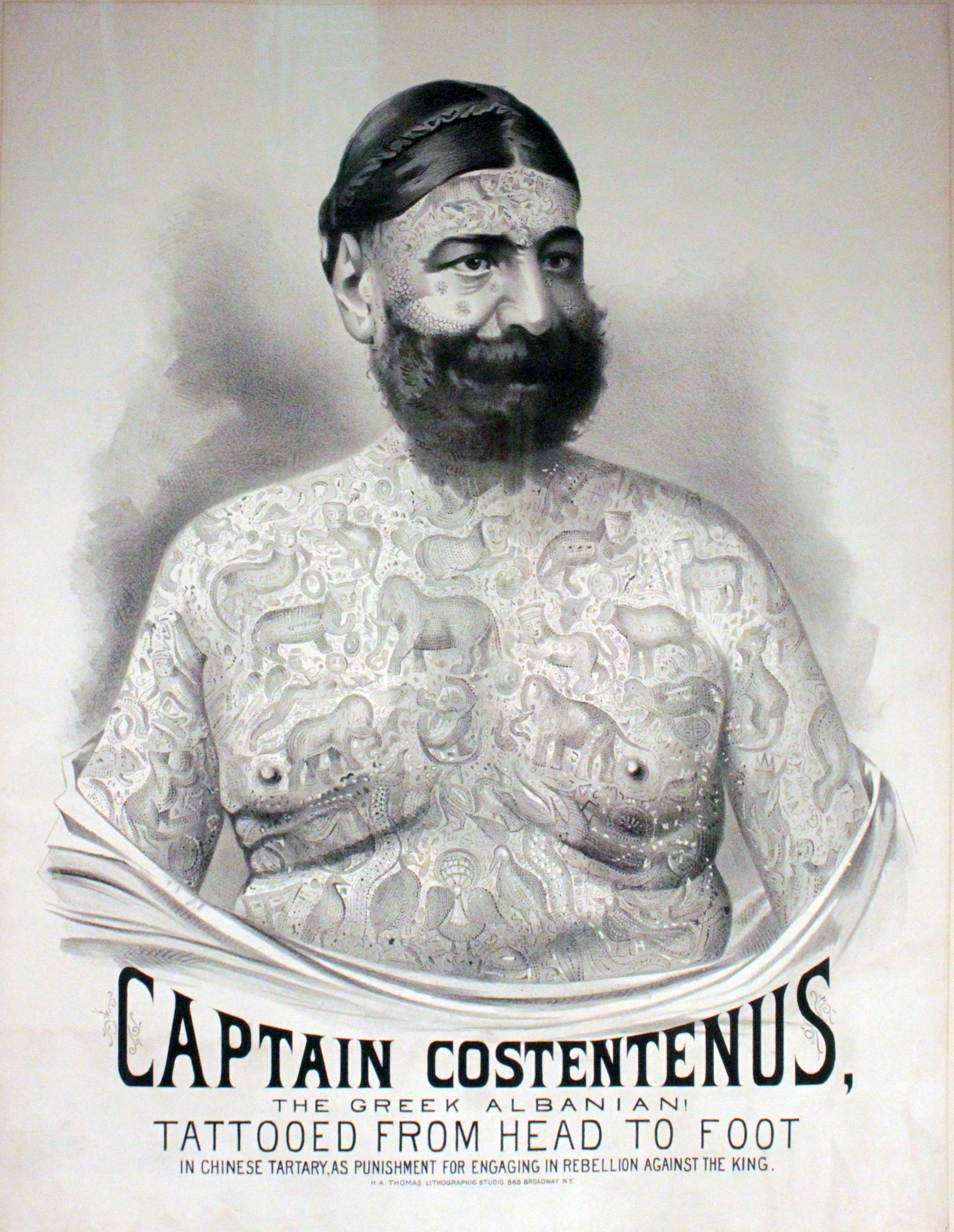
- Poster advertising Captain Costentenus as a side show for the Great Farini or P. T. Barnum circus.
- Born: April 17, 1833; Albania (then part of the Ottoman Empire)
- Died: 1894 or later Europe
- Other names: "The Arvanite Greek", "The Tattooed Greek Prince", Djordgi Konstantinus, Georgius Constantine
- Citizenship: Ottoman (1833–1883) American (December 22, 1883)
- Occupation: entertainer
- Years active: October 1874–1894
- Employer: P. T. Barnum (1876–1880)
- Known for: having 388 tattoos on his body

Captain George Costentenus, also known as "The Greek Albanian" or "The Tattooed Greek Prince", (April 17, 1833 – ?) was a circus performer in the late 1800s. A man who was tattooed over his entire body, he was a famous traveling attraction who claimed to have been kidnapped by Chinese Tartars and tattooed against his will. His surname was sometimes spelled as Constantenus and Constantinius. He was also known as Djordgi Konstantinus and Georgius Constantine.

== Early life ==
George Costentenus was born on April 17, 1833. He was a native of Albania, in the Ottoman Empire, however his family was ethnically Greek and they were Christians.

== Career ==
After being examined by the academic community, Costentenus began to exhibit himself in western Europe. In October 1874, Costentenus was exhibiting himself in Paris, France.

He came to United States around 1875 due to the coming Centennial Exposition.

He toured with P. T. Barnum's New and Greatest Show on Earth in 1876 and 1877.

In June 1878, while again on tour with Barnum a fight broke between Costentenus and the giant Colonel Routh Goshen. The fight was said to have originated after Costentenus insulted some ladies within Goshen's presence. Costentenus was injured during the fight. Costentenus toured the United States with Barnum again in 1879 and 1880.

In early 1882, he was exhibiting himself at the Royal Aquarium with an exhibition arranged by William Leonard Hunt. That same year, he became a resident of New York City.

In December 1883, Costentenus applied for United States citizenship. At the time, he was planning to go to Europe for treatment for his failing eyesight, but wanted to do so as an American citizen. At the time he was blind in one eye and losing his sight in the other. He claimed to have been in the country for seven years.

He became an American citizen on December 22, 1883. On February 16, 1884, he sailed for Europe aboard the SS Republic. In 1885 he was said to have gone blind and retired to a wealthy estate in Greece. By June 1889, he was exhibiting himself at the Folies Bergère in Paris, France. In October 1889, he returned to New York.

In 1890, he applied for a passport to travel to Europe and planned to return two years later. He applied for another passport in 1894. After that date he disappears from records.

== Marketing and public image ==
From the time he began exhibiting in western Europe in the mid-1870s, Costentenus was marketed as both an exotic curiosity and an educated gentleman. Advertisements in Europe and the United States variously described him as "The Tattooed Greek Prince", "The Greek Albanian", and "The Arvanite Greek", emphasizing aristocratic and foreign identities that enhanced his appeal to audiences.

Promotional material emphasized that his body bore 387 or 388 individual tattooed figures. The only exceptions were the soles of his feet and parts of his ears. Those images ranged from exotic animals to flowers to geometric figures to foreign writing.

Before beginning his exhibition career, Costentenus attracted the attention of physicians and anthropologists in Vienna, who counted the individual tattoos, attempted to translate the Burmese inscriptions on his fingers, and concluded that the tattoos were authentic examples of Burmese tattooing, although they expressed doubts about parts of his account of how they had been acquired.

Throughout his career, advertisements, newspaper accounts, and Costentenus's own autobiography prominently featured the story that he had been captured during an expedition in Asia and forcibly tattooed before escaping. These accounts varied in their details but consistently presented the tattooing as an extraordinary ordeal that transformed him into a living curiosity.

By 1876, Costentenus was under contract with P. T. Barnum, who reportedly paid him $100 a day to appear with his circus. When appearing before paying audiences, he exhibited himself nearly nude so visitors could examine his tattoos in detail. Away from the exhibition platform, however, he cultivated the image of a wealthy cosmopolitan gentleman, dressing in expensive clothing and wearing costly jewelry.

Advertisements also emphasized Costentenus's education, extensive travels, and ability to speak numerous languages, presenting him as more than a conventional sideshow attraction. Promotional material regularly combined aristocratic titles, his account of being forcibly tattooed, and references to examinations by European physicians and anthropologists in marketing him to audiences in Europe and the United States.
