= Hypertrichosis =

Abnormal hair growth over the body

- Other names: Werewolf syndrome
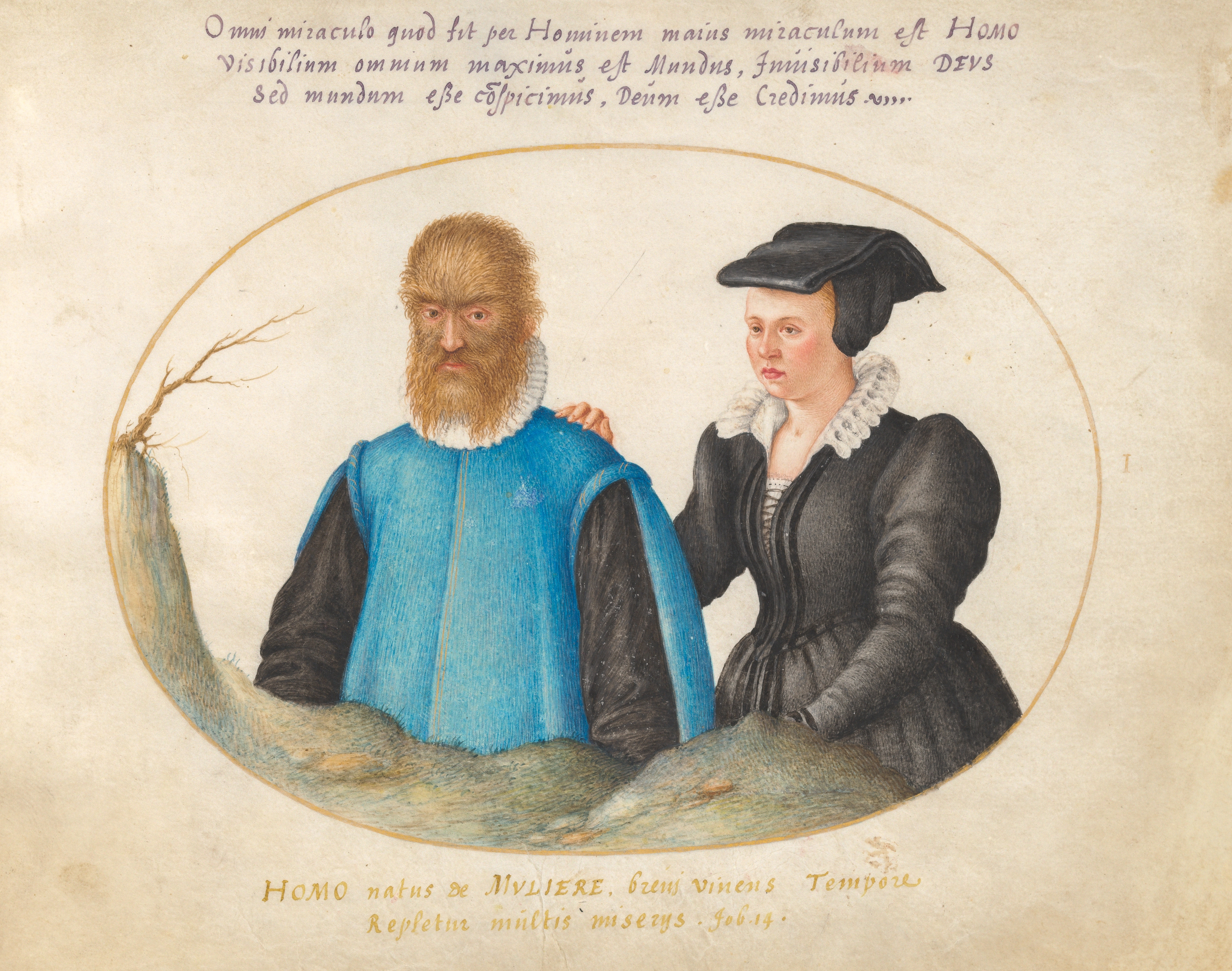
- Petrus Gonsalvus, "’The Hairy Man’", as illustrated by Joris Hoefnagel in his Elementa Depicta
- Specialty: Dermatology

Hypertrichosis (sometimes known as werewolf syndrome or Ambras syndrome) is an abnormal amount of hair growth over the body. The two distinct types of hypertrichosis are generalized hypertrichosis, which occurs over the entire body, and localized hypertrichosis, which is restricted to a certain area. Hypertrichosis can be either congenital (present at birth) or acquired (arises later in life). The excess growth of hair occurs in areas of the skin with the exception of androgen-dependent hair of the pubic area, face, and axillary regions.

Several circus sideshow performers in the 19th and early 20th centuries, such as Julia Pastrana, had hypertrichosis. Many of them worked as freaks and were promoted as having distinct human and animal traits.

== Classification ==
Two methods of classification are used for hypertrichosis. One divides them into either generalized versus localized hypertrichosis, while the other divides them into congenital versus acquired.

=== Congenital ===
Congenital forms of hypertrichosis are caused by genetic mutations, and are extremely rare, unlike acquired forms. Congenital hypertrichosis is always present at birth.

Hypertrichosis lanuginosa
Congenital hypertrichosis lanuginosa can be noticed at birth, with the infant completely covered in thin lanugo hair. In normal circumstances, lanugo hair is shed before birth and replaced by vellus hair; however, in a person with congenital hypertrichosis lanuginosa, the lanugo hair remains after birth. The palms of the hands, soles of the feet, and mucous membranes are not affected. As the person ages, the lanugo hair may thin, leaving only limited areas of hypertrichosis.
Generalized hypertrichosis
Congenital generalized hypertrichosis causes males to exhibit excessive facial and upper body hair, whereas women exhibit less severe asymmetrical hair distribution. The palms, soles, and mucous membranes are not affected.
Terminal hypertrichosis
Congenital terminal hypertrichosis is characterized by the presence of fully pigmented terminal hair that covers the entire body. This condition is usually accompanied by gingival hyperplasia. This form is most responsible for the term "werewolf syndrome" because of the thick, dark hair that appears. People with this condition are sometimes performers at circuses because of their unusual appearance.
Circumscribed hypertrichosis
Congenital circumscribed hypertrichosis is associated with the presence of thick vellus hair on the upper extremities. Circumscribed signifies this type of hypertrichosis is restricted to certain parts of the body, in this case, the extensor surfaces of the upper extremities. Hairy elbow syndrome, a type of congenital circumscribed hypertrichosis, shows excessive growth on and around the elbows. This type of hypertrichosis is present at birth, becomes more prominent during aging, and regresses at puberty.
Localized hypertrichosis
Congenital localized hypertrichosis is a localized increase in hair density and length.
Nevoid hypertrichosis
Nevoid hypertrichosis may be present at birth or appear later in life. It features an isolated area of excessive terminal hair and is usually not related to any other diseases.

=== Acquired ===
Acquired hypertrichosis appears after birth. The multiple causes include the side effects of drugs, associations with cancer, and possible links with eating disorders. Acquired forms can usually be reduced with various treatments.

Hypertrichosis lanuginosa
Acquired hypertrichosis lanuginosa is characterized by rapid growth of lanugo hair, particularly on the face. Hair also appears on the trunk and armpits, while palms and soles are unaffected. The excess hair is commonly referred to as malignant down. This hair is very fine and unpigmented.
Generalized hypertrichosis
Acquired generalized hypertrichosis commonly affects the cheeks, upper lip, and chin. This form also affects the forearms and legs, but is less common in these areas. Another deformity associated with acquired generalized hypertrichosis is multiple hairs occupying the same follicle. It may also include abnormal hair growth patterns as what happens to the eyelashes in a condition known as trichiasis. Oral minoxidil treatments for hypertension are known to cause this condition. Topical minoxidil used for alopecia causes hair growth in the areas where it is applied; however, this hair disappears shortly after discontinuing the use of topical minoxidil.
Patterned hypertrichosis
Acquired patterned hypertrichosis is an increase in hair growth in a pattern formation. It is similar to acquired generalized hypertrichosis and is a sign of internal malignancy.
Localized hypertrichosis
Acquired localized hypertrichosis is an increase in hair density and length often secondary to irritation or trauma. This form is restricted to certain areas of the body.

=== Hirsutism ===
Hypertrichosis is often mistakenly classified as hirsutism. Hirsutism is a type of hypertrichosis exclusive to women and children, resulting from an excess of androgen-sensitive hair growth. Patients with hirsutism exhibit patterns of adult male hair growth. Chest and back hair are often present on women with hirsutism.

Hirsutism is both congenital and acquired. It is linked to excessive male hormones in women, thus symptoms may include acne, deepening of the voice, irregular menstrual periods, and the formation of a more masculine body shape. Increases in androgen (male hormone) levels are the primary cause of most hirsutism cases. If caused by increased levels of androgens, it can be treated with medications that reduce androgen levels. Some birth control pills and spironolactone reduce androgen levels.

== Signs and symptoms ==
The primary characteristic of all forms of hypertrichosis is excessive hair. Hair in hypertrichosis is usually longer than expected and may consist of any hair type (lanugo, vellus, or terminal). Patterned forms of hypertrichosis cause hair growth in patterns. Generalized forms of hypertrichosis result in hair growth over the entire body. Circumscribed and localized forms lead to hair growth restricted to a certain area.

== Causes ==
=== Genetic ===
Hypertrichosis lanuginosa
Congenital hypertrichosis lanuginosa may be caused by a paracentric inversion mutation of the q22 band of chromosome 8; however, it could also possibly be the result of a spontaneous genetic mutation rather than inheritance. This form is an autosomal (not located on the sex chromosomes) dominant cutaneous disorder, that affects the skin.
Generalized hypertrichosis
Congenital generalized hypertrichosis has a dominant pattern of inheritance and has been linked to chromosome Xq24-27.1. An affected female (carrying the hypertrichosis gene) has a 50% chance of passing it to her offspring. An affected male will pass this form of hypertrichosis to his daughters, but never the sons.
Generalized hypertrichosis terminalis
Congenital generalized hypertrichosis terminalis is thought to be caused by genetic changes on chromosome 17 resulting in the addition or removal of millions of nucleotides. The gene MAP2K6 may be a factor contributing to this condition. This condition may also be due to the change in the chromosome affecting the transcription of genes.
Other hypertrichosis patterns
Porphyria cutanea tarda may manifest in some patients as hypertrichosis on the face (mainly on top of the cheeks).

=== Medical conditions ===
Acquired hypertrichosis lanuginosa is commonly present with cancer. This condition is also linked to metabolic disorders, such as anorexia, hormone imbalances, such as hyperthyroidism, or as a side effect of certain drugs.

Acquired generalized hypertrichosis may be caused by cancer. The resulting hair growth is known as malignant down. The mechanism behind cancer induced hypertrichosis is unknown. Oral and topical Minoxidil treatments are also known to cause acquired generalized hypertrichosis.

=== Medications ===
Several medications can cause generalized or localized acquired hypertrichosis including:

- Anticonvulsants: Phenytoin
- Immunosuppressants: Cyclosporine
- Vasodilators: Diazoxide and Minoxidil
- Antibiotics: Streptomycin
- Diuretics: Acetazolamide
- Photosensitizers: Psoralen

Acquired hypertrichosis is usually reversible once the causative medications are discontinued.

=== Unknown causes ===
The exact genetic mutation that causes congenital circumscribed, localized, and nevoid hypertrichosis is unknown.

== Pathophysiology ==
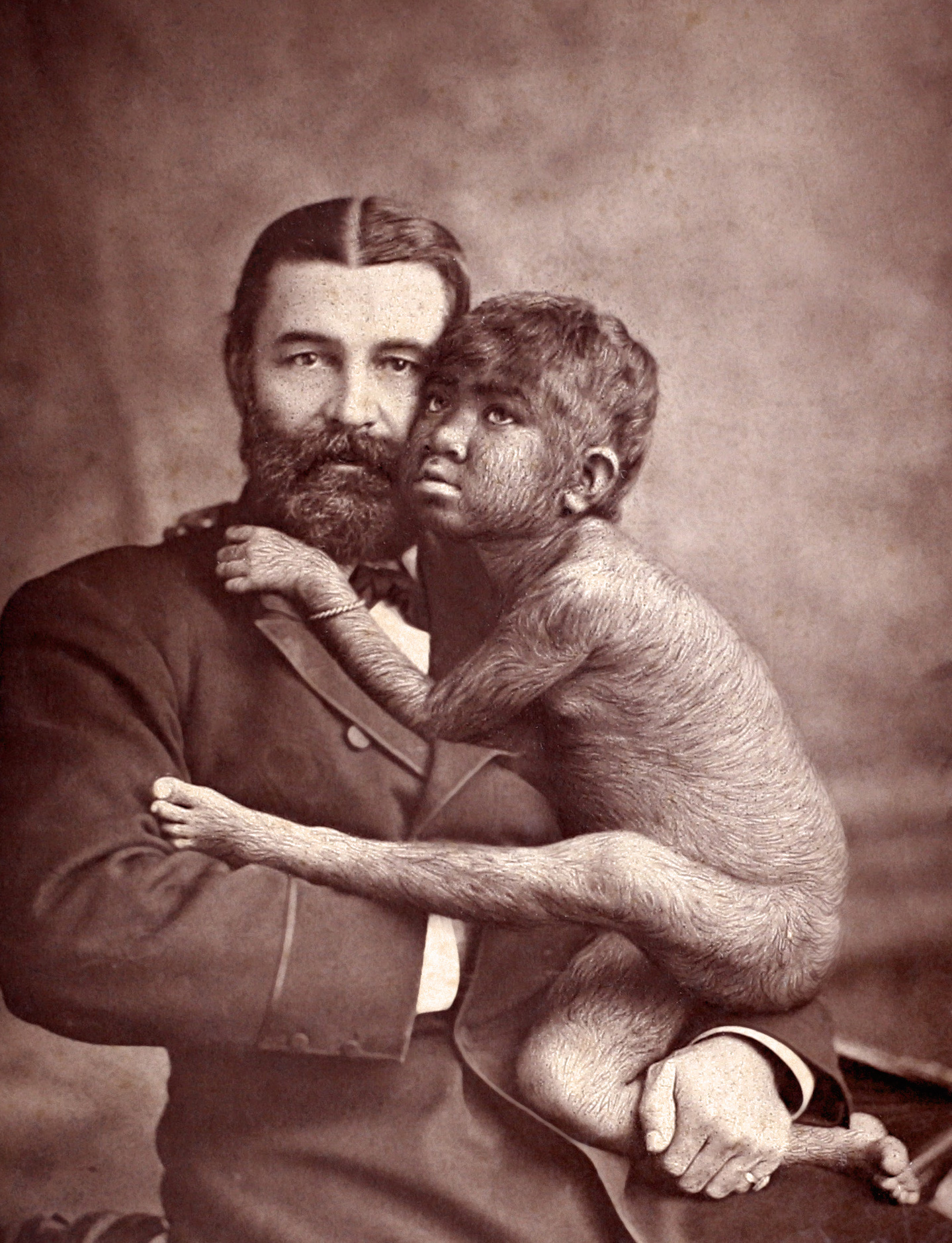
Krao Farini, 1883

A number of mechanisms can lead to hypertrichosis. One cause involves areas of the skin that are transforming from the small vellus type to the larger terminal type. This change normally occurs during adolescence, when vellus hair follicles in the underarms and groin grow into terminal hair follicles. Hypertrichosis involves this same type of switching, but in areas that do not normally produce terminal hair. The mechanisms for this switch are poorly understood.

Another mechanism involves a change in the hair cycle. There are three stages of the hair cycle: the anagen phase (hair growth), the catagen phase (hair follicle death), and the telogen phase (hair shedding). If the anagen phase increases beyond what is normal, that region of the body will experience excessive hair growth.

== Diagnosis ==
Hypertrichosis is diagnosed clinically by the occurrence of hair in excess of what is expected for age, sex, and ethnicity in areas that are not androgen-sensitive. The excess can be in the form of excessive length or density and may consist of any hair type (lanugo, vellus, or terminal).

== Management ==
There is no cure for any congenital forms of hypertrichosis. The treatment for acquired hypertrichosis is based on attempting to address the underlying cause. Acquired forms of hypertrichosis have a variety of sources, and are usually treated by removing the factor causing hypertrichosis, e.g. a medication with undesired side-effects. All hypertrichosis, congenital or acquired, can be reduced through hair removal. Hair removal treatments are categorized into two principal subdivisions: temporary removal and permanent removal. Treatment may have adverse effects by causing scarring, dermatitis, or hypersensitivity.

Temporary hair removal may last from several hours to several weeks, depending on the method used. These procedures are purely cosmetic. Depilation methods, such as trimming, shaving, and depilatories, remove hair to the level of the skin and produce results that last several hours to several days. Epilation methods, such as plucking, electrology, waxing, sugaring, threading remove the entire hair from the root, the results lasting several days to several weeks.

Permanent hair removal uses chemicals, energy of various types, or a combination to target the cells that cause hair growth. Laser hair removal is an effective method of hair removal on hairs that have color. The laser targets the melanin in the lower third of the hair follicle. Electrology uses electric current or localized heating.

As of 2006, medication to reduce production of hair is being tested. One medicinal option suppresses testosterone by increasing the sex hormone-binding globulin. Another controls the overproduction of hair through the regulation of a luteinizing hormone.

== Epidemiology ==
Congenital forms of hypertrichosis are extremely rare. Only 50 cases of congenital hypertrichosis lanuginosa have been recorded since the Middle Ages, and fewer than 100 cases of congenital generalized hypertrichosis have been documented in scientific publications and by the media. Congenital generalized hypertrichosis is isolated to one family in Mexico. Acquired hypertrichosis and hirsutism are more common. For example, hirsutism occurs in about 10% of women between ages 18 and 45.

== Society and culture ==
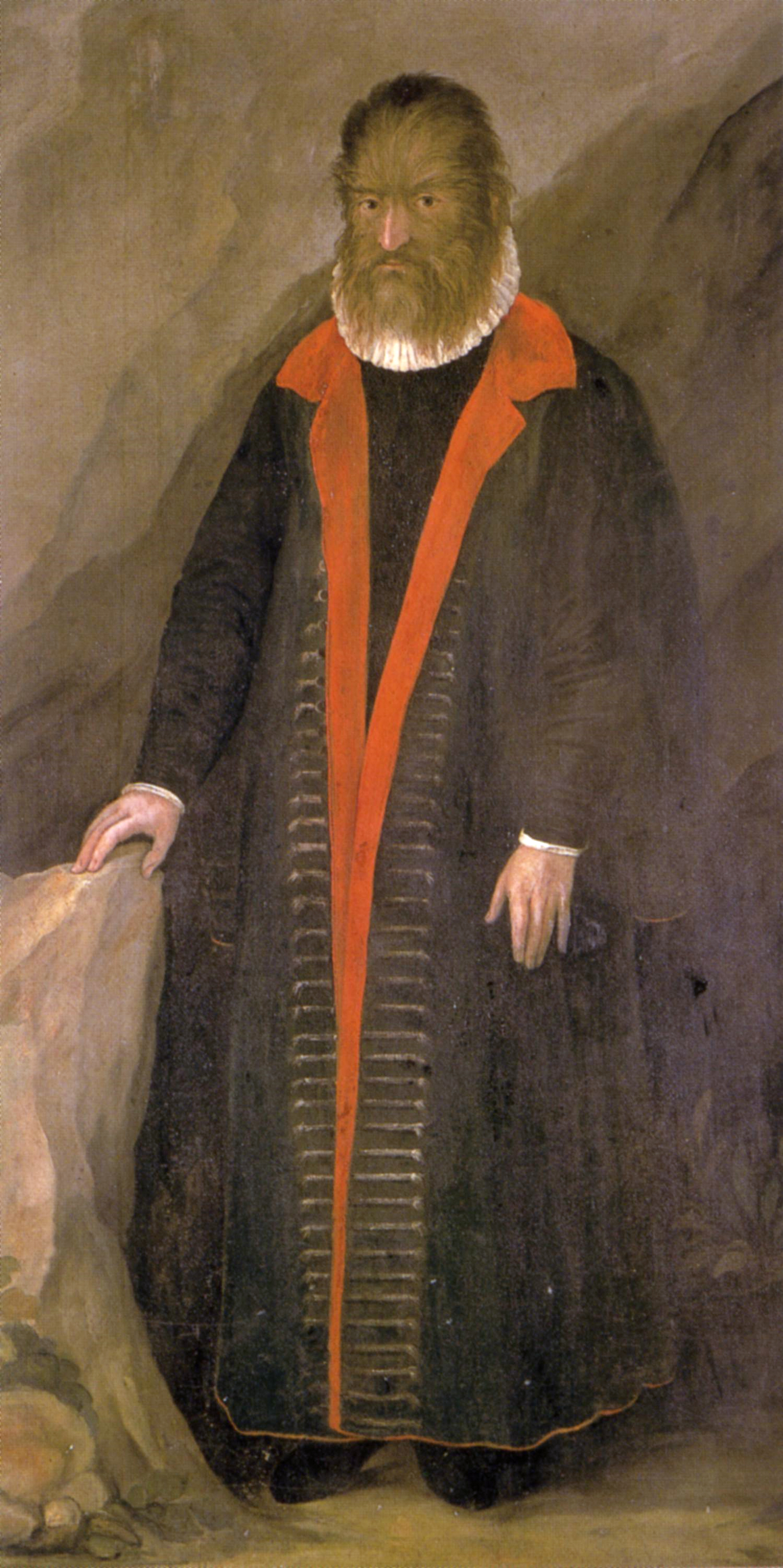
Petrus Gonsalvus, the first recorded case of hypertrichosis

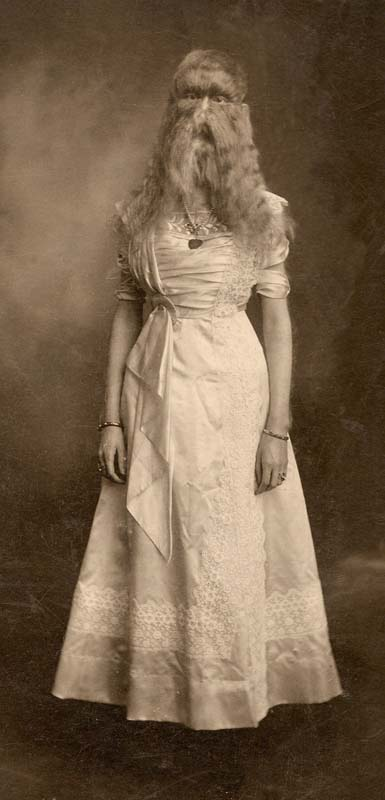
Alice Elizabeth Doherty (1887–1933), as a teenager

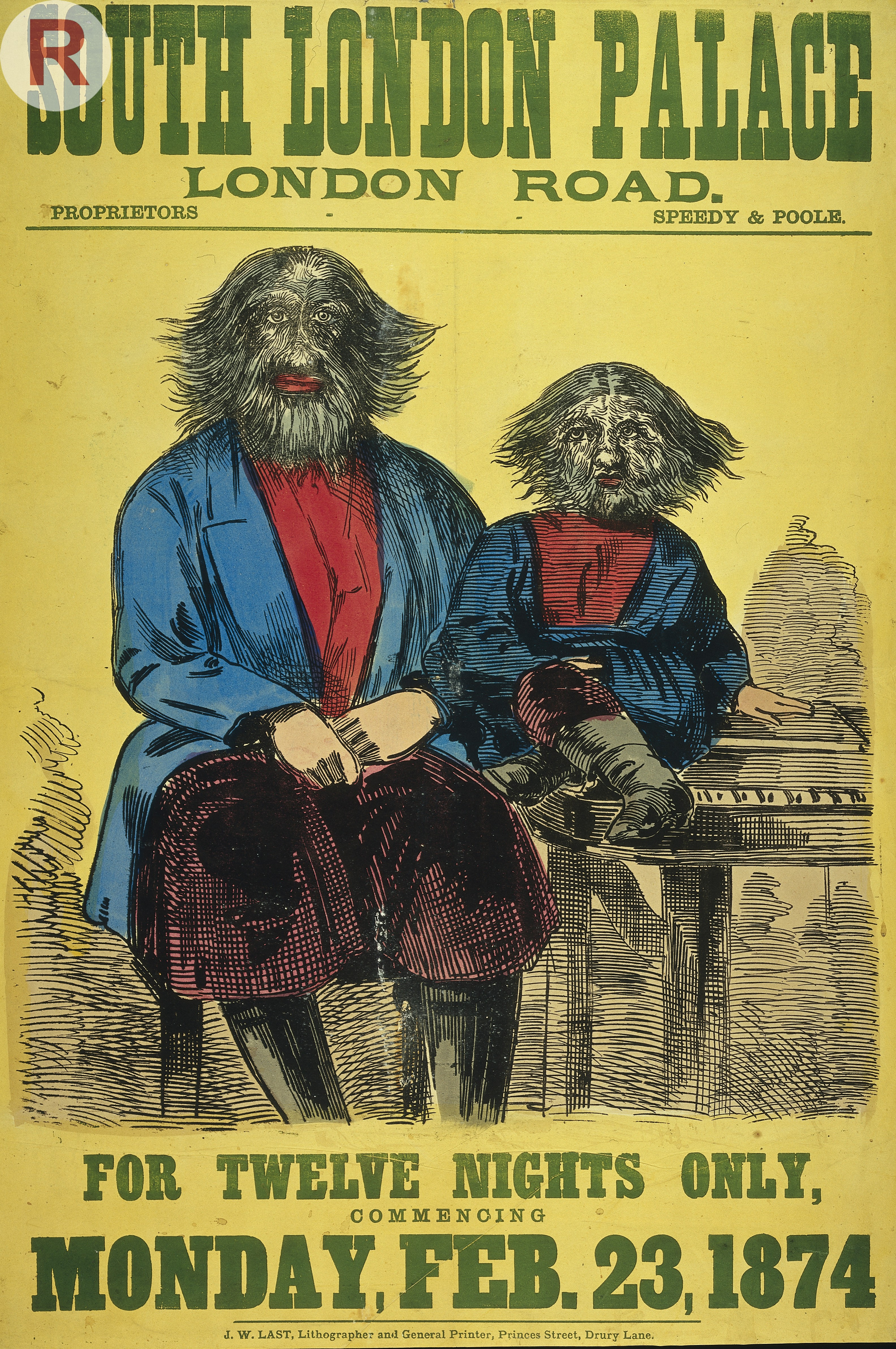
1874 London advertisement

People with hair often found jobs as circus performers, making the best of their unusual appearance. Fedor Jeftichew ("Jo-Jo the Dog-faced Man"), Stephan Bibrowski ("Lionel the Lion-faced Man"), Jesús "Chuy" Aceves ("Wolfman"), Annie Jones ("the bearded woman") and Alice Elizabeth Doherty ("The Minnesota Woolly Girl") all had hypertrichosis. Extensive hypertrichosis carries an emotional burden and can cause cosmetic embarrassment; however, some people attempt no treatments because they say it defines who they are.

=== The Gonsalvus family ===
Petrus Gonsalvus (1537–1618) was referred to by Italian naturalist Ulisse Aldrovandi as "the man of the woods". Four of his seven children were also afflicted with hypertrichosis and painted.

=== Barbara van Beck ===
Barbara van Beck (1629–1668?) is one of the first people to be depicted with Ambras syndrome. She was the only member of her family with the condition. She travelled around Europe, living in court and appearing before the nobility in cities such as London and Paris.

=== The hairy family of Burma ===
One record in history concerning congenital hypertrichosis lanuginosa is the hairy family of Burma, a four-generational pedigree of the condition. In 1826, John Crawford was leading a mission for the Governor-General of India through Burma. He tells of meeting a hairy man, Shwe-Maong. Shwe-Maong lived in the court of King Ava and acted as an entertainer. Shwe-Maong had four children: three unaffected children, and one child with congenital hypertrichosis, named Maphoon. On a second mission to Ava, Maphoon was described as a thirty-year-old woman with two sons, one of which had hypertrichosis. The affected son was named Maong-Phoset. He had an affected daughter named Mah-Me. Whereas all affected members of the family had dental problems, the unaffected members had perfect teeth.

=== Julia Pastrana ===
Julia Pastrana (1834–1860) travelled throughout the United States in a freak show as the bearded lady, capturing the attention of many artists. She is portrayed as having dark extensive hairs distributed equally throughout the surface of her body, even on the palms of her hands. Originally, she was believed to have congenital hypertrichosis lanuginosa; however, the generalized form of the syndrome coupled with her gingival hyperplasia indicated that her condition was congenital terminal hypertrichosis. This was not confirmed until after her death, when it became clear that her X-linked syndrome resulted in terminal hairs.

=== Supattra Sasupan ===
In 2011, Supattra Sasupan (Thai: สุพัตรา สะสุพันธ์; born August 5, 2000), an 11-year-old girl from Thailand with hypertrichosis was named the world's hairiest girl by the Guinness Book of World Records (as Supatra Sasuphan).

== History ==
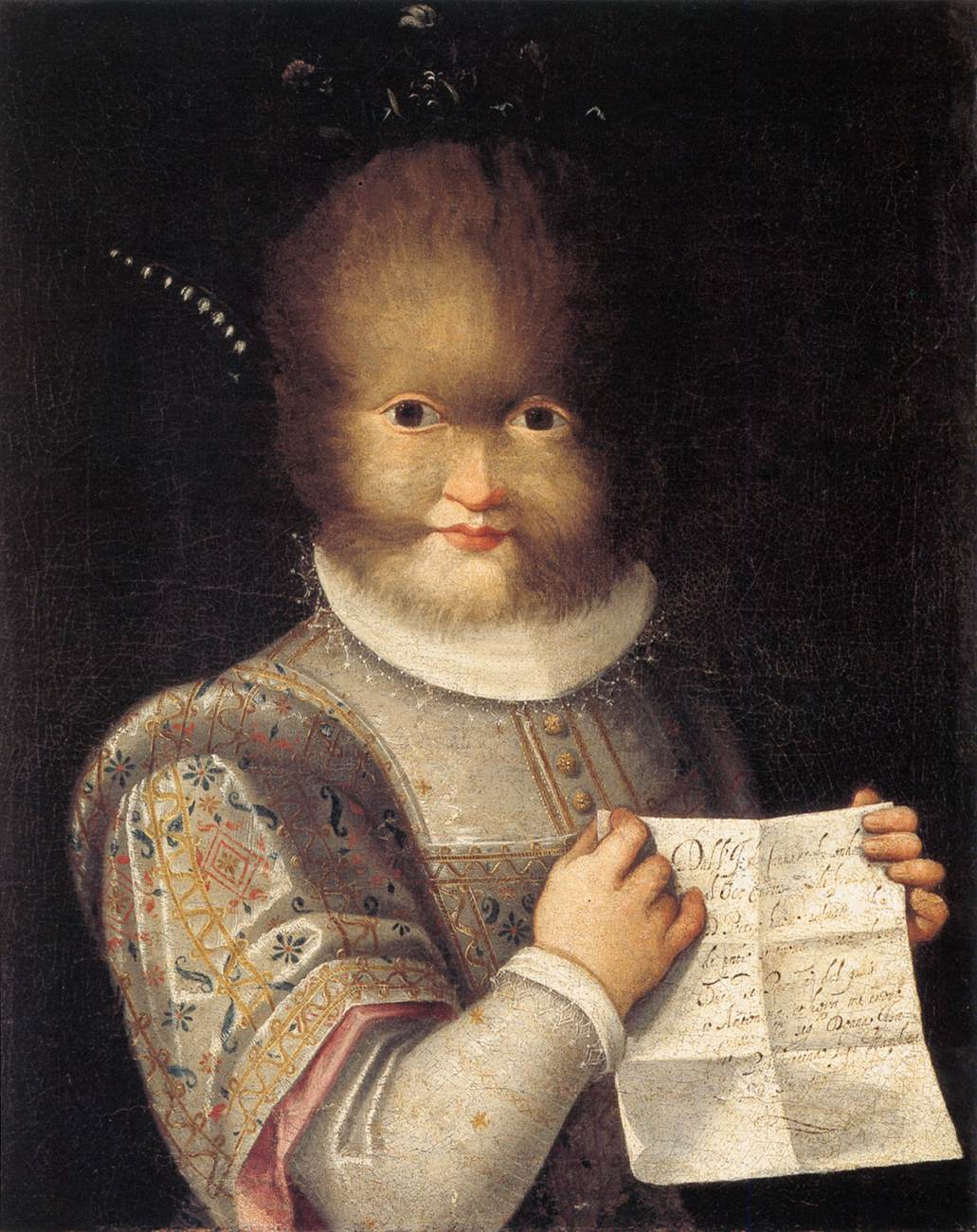
Portrait of Antonietta Gonsalvus known as Tognina.

The first recorded case of hypertrichosis was Petrus Gonsalvus who was born in the Canary Islands. This was documented by Ulisse Aldrovandi and published in his posthumous Monstrorum Historia cum Paralipomenis historiae omnium animalium in 1642. He noted that two daughters (including Antonietta Gonsalvus), a son, and a grandchild in Gonsalvus' family all had hypertrichosis. Altrovandus dubbed them the Ambras family, after Ambras Castle near Innsbruck, where portraits of the family were found. During the next 300 years, about 50 cases were observed. The scientist Rudolf Virchow described a form of hypertrichosis accompanied by gingival hyperplasia in 1873.

In summer 2019, at least 17 Spanish children developed so-called “werewolf syndrome”, Spain's health ministry has said. Instead of being treated with omeprazole, a drug that helps with gastric reflux, they had received a treatment of minoxidil, a medication against hair loss. How the laboratory FarmaQuimica Sur, based in Malaga, made the mistake, is not yet clear. The lab was closed as a precaution.

== In animals ==
In 1955, a female Müller's Bornean gibbon was obtained from Sarawak that exhibited abnormal hair growth in the facial region. It has been hypothesized that this could be due to facial hypertrichosis.

Hypertrichosis (often mistakenly classified as hirsutism) is a well documented condition in horses with a hormonal disorder of the hypothalamus, called Cushing's disease. It is the most common endocrine disease of the middle-aged to older horse, often resulting in fatal laminitis. It can be successfully controlled by medications if diagnosed early.

== See also ==
- Jesús Aceves, the first person with hypertrichosis to perform in the UK in thirty years.
- Stephan Bibrowski (1891–1932), known as Lionel the Lion-faced Man.
- Krao Farini (1876–1926), known as The Missing Link.
- Fedor Jeftichew (1868–1904), known as Jo-Jo the Dog-Faced Boy.
- Human Nature, a 2001 American-French film where one of the main characters has hypertrichosis.
- Fur: An Imaginary Portrait of Diane Arbus, a 2006 American film where one of the main characters has hypertrichosis.
- Milo, a 2012 (Netherlands) movie about a 10-year-old boy with 'hypersensitive skin'.
- Moon of Desire, a 2014 Filipino TV drama with a girl that has hypertrichosis as the main protagonist.
- The True Adventures of Wolfboy, a 2019 Drama Movie about a 13-year-old boy that has hypertrichosis.
