= Jesús Aceves =

Sideshow performer

Jesús Aceves (born in Loreto, Zacatecas, Mexico 1968) is the second person in his family born with a rare condition known as hypertrichosis. He is married and has two daughters, both of whom have the condition. His sister, Lili, was also born with hypertrichosis. She is married with one son, and works as a police officer in Mexico. Many in his family believe that they are descendants of Julia Pastrana, the "Monkey Girl".

In 2007, he was featured in Ripley's Believe It or Not! and Guinness World Records.

== Television appearances ==
- It's Not Easy Being a Wolf Boy (BBC)
- Human Mutants (BBC)
- Grand Prix of Human Wonders (Japan)
- The Maury Povich Show
- Monsterquest
- Chuy, The Wolf Man a feature-length documentary film by Eva Aridjis (Mexico)

== Performances ==
- Hellzapoppin Circus SideShow Revue
- Ripley's Believe It or Not! (Taiwan)
- Sterling & Reid Brothers Circus
- Circo Caballero
- Brothers Grim Sideshow
- Sideshow By The Seashore
- Arthurs Family Circus
- Venice Beach Freakshow
- The Circus of Horrors
