= Fedor Jeftichew =

Russian sideshow performer (1868-1904)

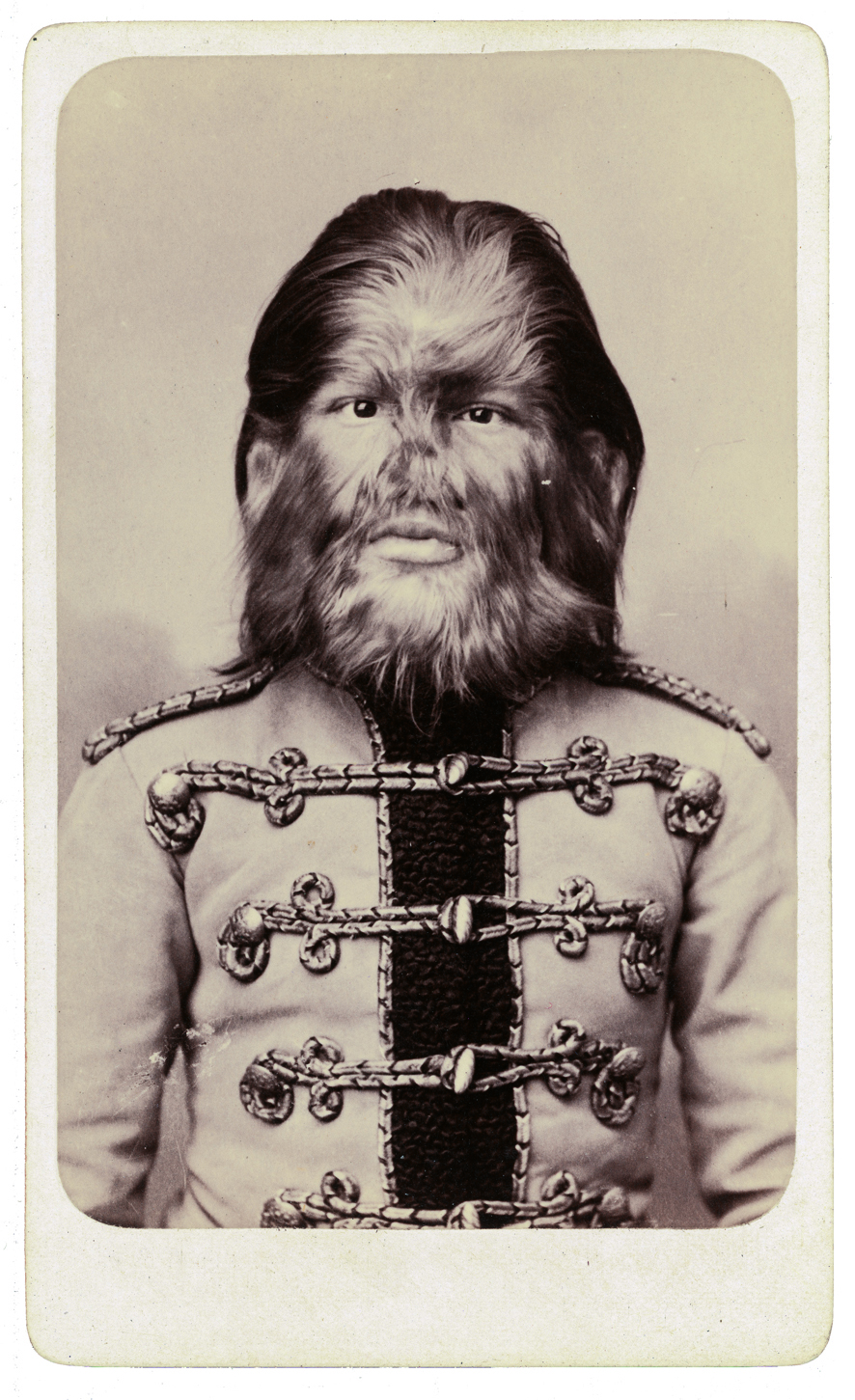
A portrait of Jeftichew

Fedor Adrianovich Jeftichew (Russian: Фёдор Адрианович Евтищев, Fyodor Yevtishchev, 1868 – January 31, 1904), better known as Jo-Jo the Dog-Faced Boy (later Jo-Jo the Dog-Faced Man), was a famous Russian sideshow performer who toured Europe with his father, the ‘Wild Man from the Kostroma Forest’, in 1873 and was brought to the United States of America in 1884 by P.T. Barnum.

== Biography ==
Born in Saint Petersburg, Imperial Russia in 1868, Fedor Jeftichew suffered from the medical condition hypertrichosis. His father Adrian, also hypertrichotic, had performed in French circuses. In 1873 Adrian appeared in European exhibitions as the "Wild Man from the Kostroma Forest", along with his son. Ten years later Fedor returned as "Theodore Petroff", was recruited by a P. T. Barnum agent in 1884, and joined Barnum in America as "Jo-Jo The Dog-Faced Boy"

Barnum created a story that involved a hunter in Kostroma who tracked Fedor and his father to their cave and captured them. Barnum described Adrian as a savage who could not be civilized. Barnum made a point of stressing Fedor's resemblance to a dog, and explained that when he was upset he would bark and growl. In the show, Fedor obliged by doing so.

Fedor spoke Russian, German, and English, and toured Europe and the United States extensively.

He died in Salonica, Greece, then part of the Ottoman Empire, from pneumonia on January 31, 1904.

== In popular culture ==
- In the 1940 movie Strike Up the Band (time 54:27), Mickey Rooney takes his date to the fair, and they see a carnival barker who is charging $1 to come into the tent and see "Jo-Jo the Dog-Faced Boy."
- In the 1988 movie Big Top Pee-wee Benicio del Toro portrays Duke, the Dog-Faced Boy.
- In the 1995 episode of The X-Files, season 2, episode 20, "Humbug," the character Sheriff James Hamilton is revealed to have been the sideshow act "Jim-Jim the dog-faced boy" as a child. An edited photograph of Jeftichew was used in the episode.
- In the 1998 episode of Buffy the Vampire Slayer, season 2, episode 6, "Halloween," a character named Cordelia mentions being attacked by "Jo-jo the dog-faced boy."
- In the 2017 movie The Greatest Showman, a fictional portrayal of P. T. Barnum, Luciano Acuna Jr. portrayed "Dog Boy."

== Gallery ==
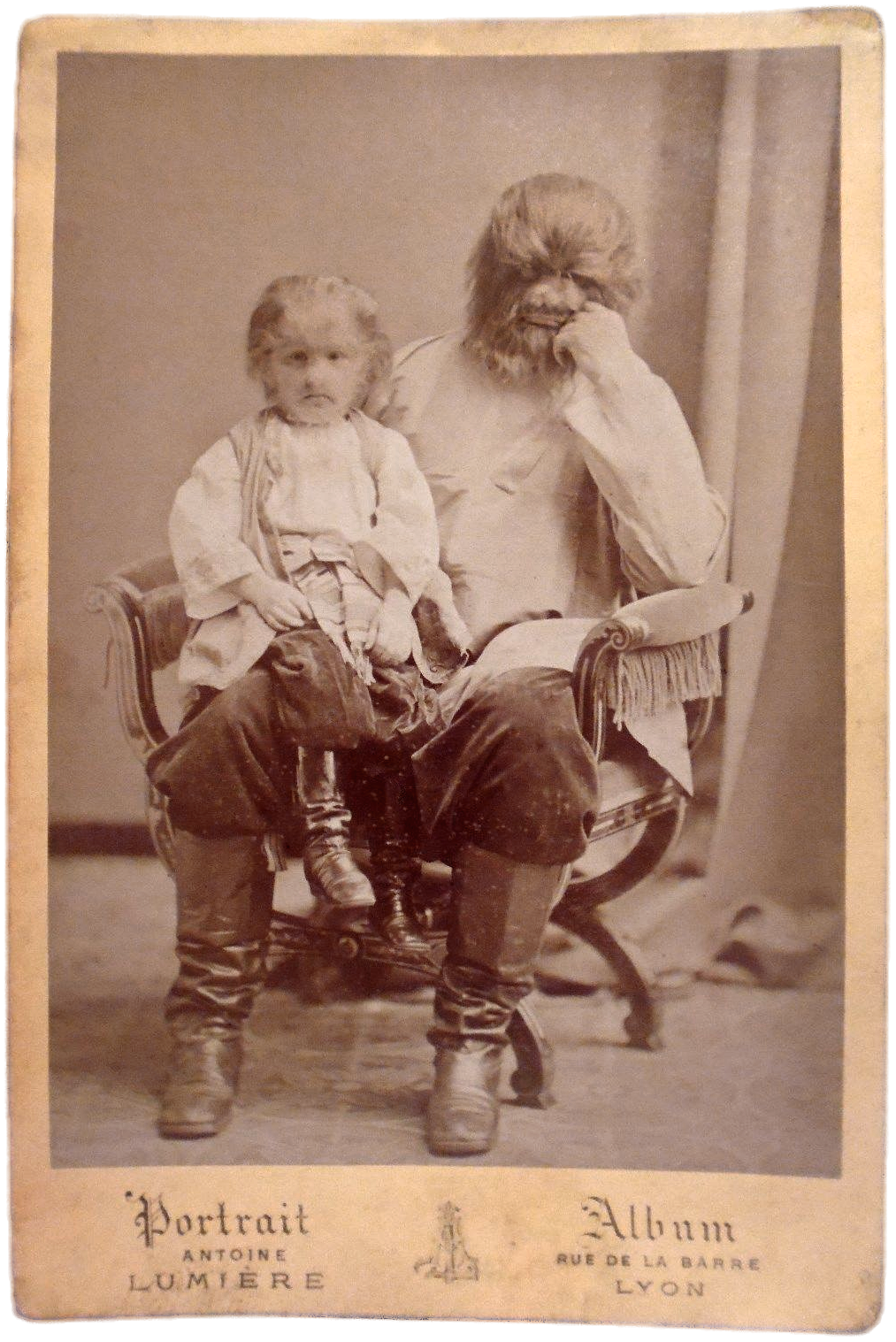
Fedor with his father

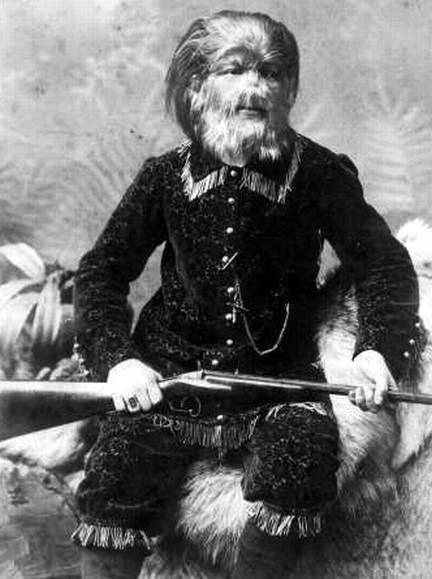
Fedor Jeftichew, c. 14 years of age.

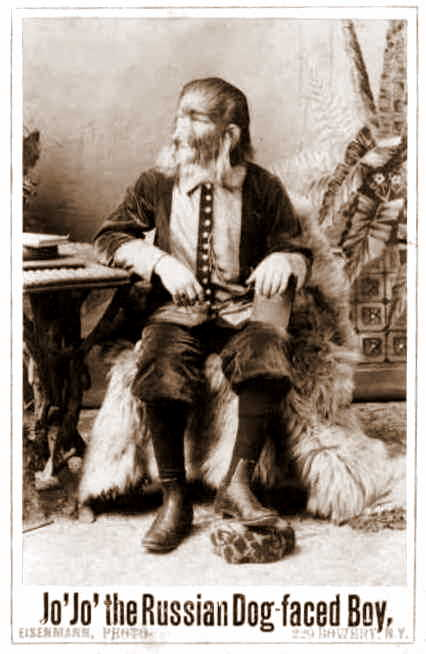
before 1904

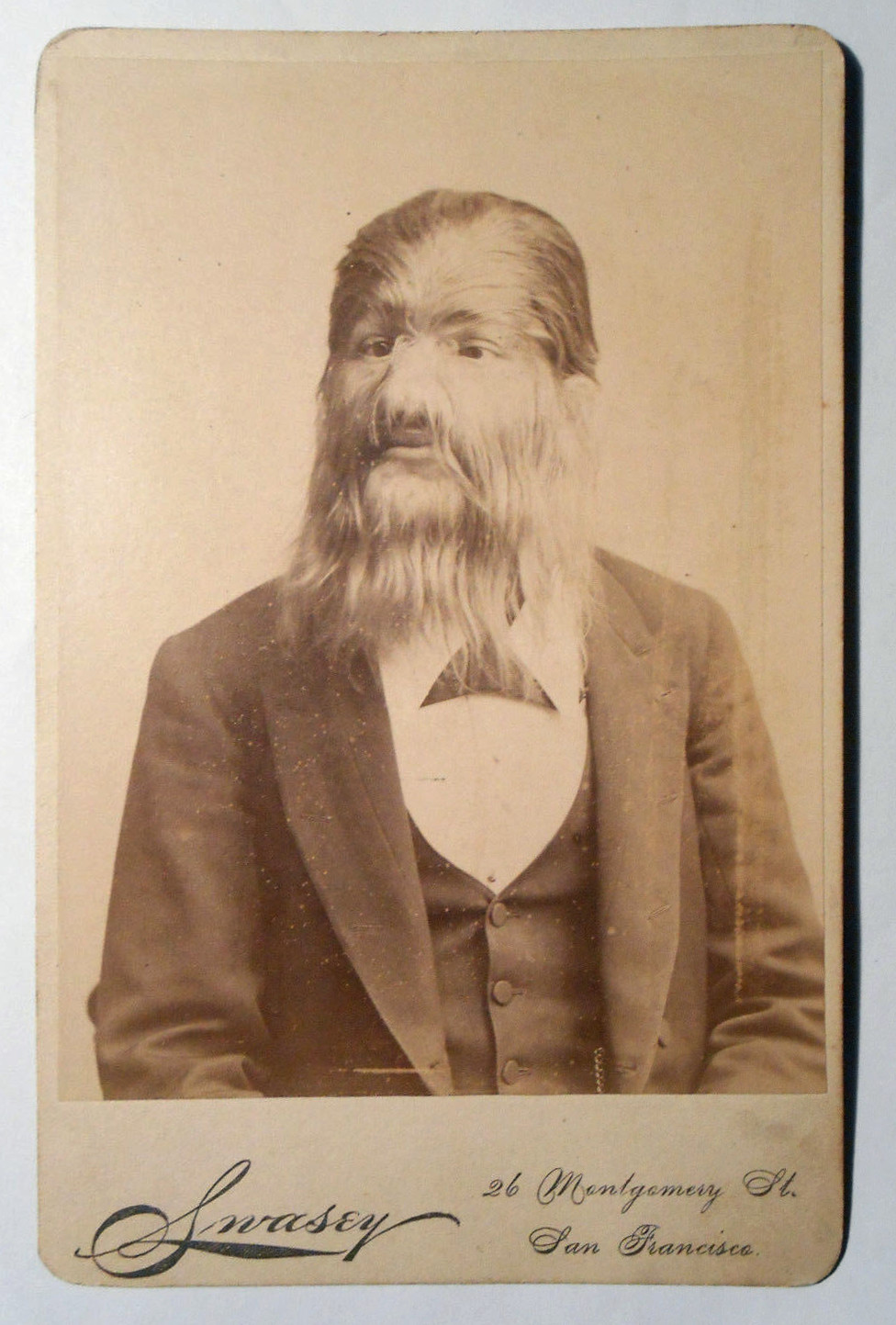
between 1888-1896

== Bibliography ==
- Hornberger, Francine. 2005. "Fedor Jeftichew". In Carny folk: the world's weirdest side show acts, pp. 144–145. New York: Citadel.
