= Alice Elizabeth Doherty =

Sideshow performer (1887–1933)

Alice Doherty
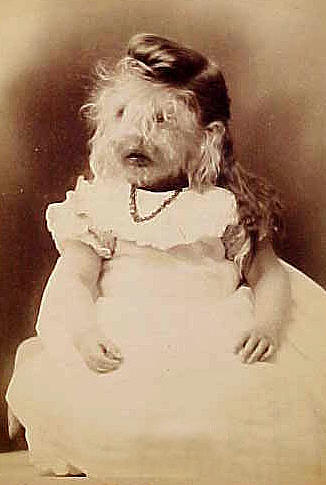
- Doherty as a child
- Born: Alice Elizabeth Doherty; March 14, 1887; Minneapolis, Minnesota, U.S.
- Died: June 13, 1933 (aged 46); Dallas, Texas, U.S.
- Other name: "The Minnesota Woolly Girl"

Alice Elizabeth Doherty (March 14, 1887 – June 13, 1933) was an American woman born with the condition hypertrichosis lanuginosa.

== Early life ==
Alice Elizabeth Doherty was born on March 14, 1887, in Minneapolis, Minnesota. Her parents were not affected by the condition for which she later became known, and she had a brother and a sister who likewise did not exhibit similar characteristics.

At birth, Doherty was covered with approximately 2 inches (5.1 cm) of silky blond hair over her body, a characteristic of the rare condition hypertrichosis lanuginosa.

Contemporary newspaper accounts described Doherty as an intelligent and energetic child with blue eyes and a playful disposition. One report published when she was two years old characterized her as "as bright as a silver dollar" and "as frolicsome as a kitten". The same account noted that she had not yet developed teeth and speculated that she might never do so.

== Exhibition ==
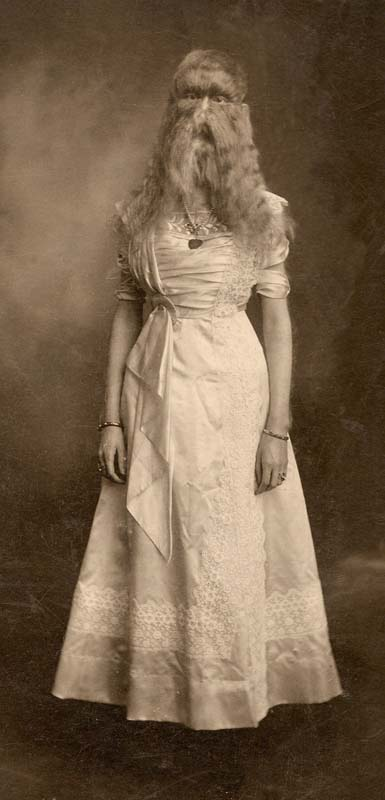
Doherty as a teenager

Doherty was exhibited by her parents as a sideshow attraction from as early as the age of two. Later she was presented commercially by her mother and Professor Weller's One-Man Band throughout the Midwestern United States. She was consistently shown as a standalone exhibit in store front exhibitions. By the time she was five years old, her hair grew to about 5 inches (130 mm), eventually increasing to about 9 inches (230 mm) by the time she was a teenager. Doherty was never interested in entertainment, but continued to perform to support her family, anxiously awaiting retirement.

== Death ==
Doherty retired from the entertainment business in 1915 and died of bronchial pneumonia in Dallas, Texas, on June 13, 1933, aged 46.
