= Natural history (disambiguation) =

Natural history is the scientific study of plants or animals.

Natural History may also refer to:

== Science and medicine ==
- Natural History (Pliny), Naturalis Historia, a 1st-century work by Pliny the Elder
- Natural History, a 16th-century work by Adam Lonicer
- Naturalis Historia Scotiae, a 1684 work by Robert Sibbald
- The Natural History of Iceland, a 1752 work by Niels Horrebow
- Natural History (magazine), an American magazine
- Natural History Review, a 19th-century UK quarterly journal
- Natural History Publications (Borneo), a publishing house based in Borneo
- Natural history of disease, the uninterrupted progression of a medical condition in an individual
  - Natural history group, subjects in a drug trial that receive no treatment of any kind, whose illness is left to run its course

== Music ==
- Natural History (I Am Kloot album), 2001
- Natural History: The Very Best of Talk Talk, a 1990 album by Talk Talk
- The Natural History (band), an American rock band
  - The Natural History (EP), the band's 2002 debut EP
- Natural History (J. D. Souther album), 2011
- Histoires naturelles, a song cycle by Maurice Ravel

== Literature ==
- A 1992 novel by American writer Maureen Howard
- A 2003 novel by British writer Justina Robson
- A 2007 novel by British writer Neil Cross

== Other ==
- "Natural History" (How I Met Your Mother), a 2010 episode of How I Met Your Mother
- NHNZ, formerly Natural History New Zealand, a New Zealand-based factual television production company

== See also ==
- Naturalis historia (disambiguation)
- Natural theology
- Nature studies (disambiguation)
- Nature (disambiguation)
- Unnatural History (disambiguation)
