= Nature studies (disambiguation) =

Nature studies was a late 19th-century educational movement.

Nature studies may also refer to:

- Natural history, the study of plants, animals, and other organisms
- Natural science, a broad branch of science
- Nature Studies (manuscript), a 16th-century illustrated manuscript
- Nature Studies, a musical piece by Adrian Beaumont
- Nature Studies, 1882 book by Edward Clodd and others
