= Placebo-controlled study =

Type of medical experiment

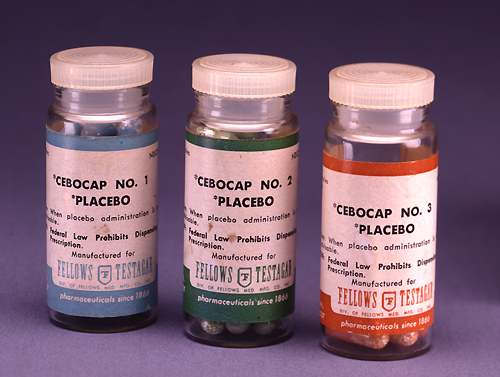
Prescription placebos used in research and practice

Placebo-controlled studies are a way of testing a medical therapy in which, in addition to a group of subjects that receives the treatment to be evaluated, a separate control group receives a sham "placebo" treatment which is specifically designed to have no real effect. Placebos are most commonly used in blinded trials, where subjects do not know whether they are receiving real or placebo treatment. Often, there is also a further "natural history" group that does not receive any treatment at all.

The purpose of the placebo group is to account for the placebo effect, that is, effects from treatment that do not depend on the treatment itself. Such factors include knowing one is receiving a treatment, attention from health care professionals, and the expectations of a treatment's effectiveness by those running the research study. Without a placebo group to compare against, it is not possible to know whether the treatment itself had any effect.

Patients frequently show improvement even when given a sham or "fake" treatment. Such intentionally inert placebo treatments can take many forms, such as a pill containing only sugar, or a medical device (such as an ultrasound machine) that is not actually turned on. Also, due to the body's natural healing ability and statistical effects such as regression to the mean, many patients will get better even when given no treatment at all. Thus, the relevant question when assessing a treatment is not "does the treatment work?" but "does the treatment work better than a placebo treatment, or no treatment at all?" More broadly, the aim of a clinical trial is to determine what treatments, delivered in what circumstances, to which patients, in what conditions, are the most effective.

Therefore, the use of placebos is a standard control component of most clinical trials, which attempt to make some sort of quantitative assessment of the efficacy of medicinal drugs or treatments. Such a test or clinical trial is called a placebo-controlled study, and its control is of the negative type. A study whose control is a previously tested treatment, rather than no treatment, is called a positive-control study, because its control is of the positive type.

This close association of placebo effects with randomized controlled trials has a profound impact on how placebo effects are understood and valued in the scientific community.

== Methodology ==
=== Blinding ===
Blinding is the withholding of information from participants which may influence them in some way until after the experiment is complete. Good blinding may reduce or eliminate experimental biases such as confirmation bias, the placebo effect, the observer effect, and others. A blind can be imposed on any participant of an experiment, including subjects, researchers, technicians, data analysts, and evaluators. In some cases, while blinding would be useful, it is impossible or unethical. For example, is not possible to blind a patient to their treatment in a physical therapy intervention. A good clinical protocol ensures that blinding is as effective as possible within ethical and practical constrains.

During the course of an experiment, a participant becomes unblinded if they deduce or otherwise obtain information that has been masked to them. Unblinding that occurs before the conclusion of a study is a source of experimental error, as the bias that was eliminated by blinding is re-introduced. Unblinding is common in blind experiments, and must be measured and reported.

=== Natural history groups ===
The practice of using an additional natural history group as the trial's so-called "third arm" has emerged; and trials are conducted using three randomly selected, equally matched trial groups, Reilly wrote: "... it is necessary to remember the adjective 'random' [in the term 'random sample'] should apply to the method of drawing the sample and not to the sample itself."

- The Active drug group (A): who receive the active test drug.
- The Placebo drug group (P): who receive a placebo drug that simulates the active drug.
- The Natural history group (NH): who receive no treatment of any kind (and whose condition, therefore, is allowed to run its natural course).

The outcomes within each group are observed, and compared with each other, allowing us to measure:

- The efficacy of the active drug's treatment: the difference between A and NH (i.e., A-NH).
- The efficacy of the active drug's active ingredient: the difference between A and P (i.e., A-P).
- The magnitude of the placebo response: the difference between P and NH (i.e., P-NH).

It is a matter of interpretation whether the value of P-NH indicates the efficacy of the entire treatment process or the magnitude of the "placebo response". The results of these comparisons then determine whether or not a particular drug is considered efficacious.

Natural-History groups yield useful information when separate groups of subjects are used in a parallel or longitudinal study design. In crossover studies, however, where each subject undergoes both treatments in succession, the natural history of the chronic condition under investigation (e.g., progression) is well understood, with the study's duration being chosen such that the condition's intensity will be more or less stable over that duration. (Wang et al. provide the example of late-phase diabetes, whose natural history is long enough that even a crossover study lasting one year is acceptable.) In these circumstances, a natural history group is not expected to yield useful information.

=== Indexing ===
In certain clinical trials of particular drugs, it may happen that the level of the "placebo responses" manifested by the trial's subjects are either considerably higher or lower (in relation to the "active" drug's effects) than one would expect from other trials of similar drugs. In these cases, with all other things being equal, it is reasonable to conclude that:

- the degree to which there is a considerably higher level of "placebo response" than one would expect is an index of the degree to which the drug's active ingredient is not efficacious.
- the degree to which there is a considerably lower level of "placebo response" than one would expect is an index of the degree to which, in some particular way, the placebo is not simulating the active drug in an appropriate way.

However, in particular cases such as the use of Cimetidine to treat ulcers, a significant level of placebo response can also prove to be an index of how much the treatment has been directed at a wrong target.

== Implementation issues ==
=== Adherence ===
The Coronary Drug Project was intended to study the safety and effectiveness of drugs for long-term treatment of coronary heart disease in men. Those in the placebo group who adhered to the placebo treatment (took the placebo regularly as instructed) showed nearly half the mortality rate as those who were not adherent. A similar study of women similarly found survival was nearly 2.5 times greater for those who adhered to their placebo. This apparent placebo effect may have occurred because:

- Adhering to the protocol had a psychological effect, i.e. genuine placebo effect.
- People who were already healthier were more able or more inclined to follow the protocol.
- Compliant people were more diligent and health-conscious in all aspects of their lives.

=== Unblinding ===
In some cases, a study participant may deduce or otherwise obtain information that has been blinded to them. For example, a patient taking a psychoactive drug may recognize that they are taking a drug. When this occurs, it is called unblinding. This kind of unblinding can be reduced with the use of an active placebo, which is a drug that produces effects similar to the active drug, making it more difficult for patients to determine which group they are in.

An active placebo was used in the Marsh Chapel Experiment, a blinded study in which the experimental group received the psychedelic substance psilocybin while the control group received a large dose of niacin, a substance that produces noticeable physical effects intended to lead the control subjects to believe they had received the psychoactive drug.

== History ==
=== James Lind and scurvy ===
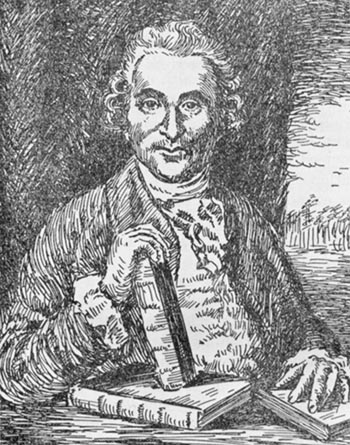
A portrait of Scottish doctor James Lind (1716–1794)

In 1747, James Lind (1716–1794), the ship's doctor on HMS Salisbury, conducted the first clinical trial when he investigated the efficacy of citrus fruit in cases of scurvy. He randomly divided twelve scurvy patients, whose "cases were as similar as I could have them", into six pairs. Each pair was given a different remedy. According to Lind's 1753 Treatise on the Scurvy in Three Parts Containing an Inquiry into the Nature, Causes, and Cure of the Disease, Together with a Critical and Chronological View of what has been Published of the Subject, the remedies were: one quart of cider per day, twenty-five drops of elixir vitriol (sulfuric acid) three times a day, two spoonfuls of vinegar three times a day, a course of sea-water (half a pint every day), two oranges and one lemon each day, and electuary, (a mixture containing garlic, mustard, balsam of Peru, and myrrh).

He noted that the pair who had been given the oranges and lemons were so restored to health within six days of treatment that one of them returned to duty, and the other was well enough to attend the rest of the sick.

=== Animal magnetism ===
In 1784, the French Royal Commission investigated the existence of animal magnetism, comparing the effects of allegedly "magnetized" water with that of plain water. It did not examine the practices of Franz Mesmer, but examined the significantly different practices of his associate Charles d'Eslon (1739–1786).

=== Perkins tractors ===
In 1799, John Haygarth investigated the efficacy of medical instruments called "Perkins tractors", by comparing the results from dummy wooden tractors with a set of allegedly "active" metal tractors, and published his findings in a book On the Imagination as a Cause & as a Cure of Disorders of the Body.

=== Flint and placebo active treatment comparison ===
In 1863 Austin Flint (1812–1886) conducted the first-ever trial that directly compared the efficacy of a dummy simulator with that of an active treatment; although Flint's examination did not compare the two against each other in the same trial. Even so, this was a significant departure from the (then) customary practice of contrasting the consequences of an active treatment with what Flint described as "the natural history of [an untreated] disease".

Flint's paper is the first time that he terms "placebo" or "placeboic remedy" were used to refer to a dummy simulator in a clinical trial.

... to secure the moral effect of a remedy given specially for the disease, the patients were placed on the use of a placebo which consisted, in nearly all of the cases, of the tincture of quassia, very largely diluted. This was given regularly, and became well known in my wards as the placeboic remedy for rheumatism.

Flint treated 13 hospital inmates who had rheumatic fever; 11 were "acute", and 2 were "sub-acute". He then compared the results of his dummy "placeboic remedy" with that of the active treatment's already well-understood results. (Flint had previously tested, and reported on, the active treatment's efficacy.) There was no significant difference between the results of the active treatment and his "placeboic remedy" in 12 of the cases in terms of disease duration, duration of convalescence, number of joints affected, and emergence of complications. In the thirteenth case, Flint expressed some doubt whether the particular complications that had emerged (namely, pericarditis, endocarditis, and pneumonia) would have been prevented if that subject had been immediately given the "active treatment".

=== Jellinek and headache remedy ingredients ===
Jellinek in 1946 was asked to test whether or not the headache drug's overall efficacy would be reduced if certain ingredients were removed. In post-World War II 1946, pharmaceutical chemicals were restricted, and one U.S. headache remedy manufacturer sold a drug composed of three ingredients: a, b, and c, and chemical b was in particular short supply.

Jellinek set up a complex trial involving 199 subjects, all of whom had "frequent headaches". The subjects were randomly divided into four test groups. He prepared four test drugs, involving various permutations of the three drug constituents, with a placebo as a scientific control. The structure of this trial is significant because, in those days, the only time placebos were ever used "was to express the efficacy or non-efficacy of a drug in terms of "how much better" the drug was than the "placebo". (Note that the trial conducted by Austin Flint is an example of such a drug efficacy vs. placebo efficacy trial.) The four test drugs were identical in shape, size, colour and taste:

- Drug A: contained a, b, and c.
- Drug B: contained a and c.
- Drug C: contained a and b.
- Drug D: a 'simulator', contained "ordinary lactate".

Each time a subject had a headache, they took their group's designated test drug, and recorded whether their headache had been relieved (or not). Although "some subjects had only three headaches in the course of a two-week period while others had up to ten attacks in the same period", the data showed a "great consistency" across all subjects Every two weeks the groups' drugs were changed; so that by the end of eight weeks, all groups had tested all the drugs. The stipulated drug (i.e., A, B, C, or D) was taken as often as necessary over each two-week period, and the two-week sequences for each of the four groups were:

1. A, B, C, D
2. B, A, D, C
3. C, D, A, B
4. D, C, B, A.

Over the entire population of 199 subjects, there were 120 "subjects reacting to placebo" and 79 "subjects not reacting to placebo".

On initial analysis, there was no difference between the self-reported "success rates" of Drugs A, B, and C (84%, 80%, and 80% respectively) (the "success rate" of the simulating placebo Drug D was 52%); and, from this, it appeared that ingredient b was completely unnecessary.

However, further analysis on the trial demonstrated that ingredient b made a significant contribution to the remedy's efficacy. Examining his data, Jellinek discovered that there was a very significant difference in responses between the 120 placebo-responders and the 79 non-responders. The 79 non-responders' reports showed that if they were considered as an entirely separate group, there was a significant difference the "success rates" of Drugs A, B, and C: viz., 88%, 67%, and 77%, respectively. And because this significant difference in relief from the test drugs could only be attributed to the presence or absence of ingredient b, he concluded that ingredient b was essential.

Two conclusions came from this trial:

- Jellinek, having identified 120 "placebo reactors", went on to suppose that all of them may have had either "psychological headaches" (with or without attendant "hypochondriasis") or "true physiological headaches [which were] accessible to suggestion". Thus, according to this view, the degree to which a "placebo response" is present tends to be an index of the psychogenic origins of the condition in question.
- It indicated that, whilst any given placebo was inert, a responder to that particular placebo may be responding for a wide number of reasons unconnected with the drug's active ingredients; and, from this, it could be important to pre-screen potential test populations, and treat those manifesting a placebo-response as a special group, or remove them altogether from the test population!

=== MRC and randomized trials ===
It used to be thought that the first-ever randomized clinical trial was the trial conducted by the Medical Research Council (MRC) in 1948 into the efficacy of streptomycin in the treatment of pulmonary tuberculosis. In this trial, there were two test groups:

1. those "treated by streptomycin and bed-rest", and
2. those "[treated] by bed-rest alone" (the control group).

What made this trial novel was that the subjects were randomly allocated to their test groups. The up-to-that-time practice was to allocate subjects alternately to each group, based on the order in which they presented for treatment. This practice could be biased, because those admitting each patient knew to which group that patient would be allocated (and so the decision to admit or not admit a specific patient might be influenced by the experimenter's knowledge of the nature of their illness, and their knowledge of the group to which they would occupy).

Recently, an earlier MRC trial on the antibiotic patulin on the course of common colds has been suggested to have been the first randomized trial. Another early and until recently overlooked randomized trial was published on strophanthin in a local Finnish journal in 1946.

== Declaration of Helsinki ==
From the time of the Hippocratic Oath questions of the ethics of medical practice have been widely discussed, and codes of practice have been gradually developed as a response to advances in scientific medicine. The Nuremberg Code, which was issued in August 1947, as a consequence of the so-called Doctors' Trial which examined the human experimentation conducted by Nazi doctors during World War II, offers ten principles for legitimate medical research, including informed consent, absence of coercion, and beneficence towards experiment participants.

In 1964, the World Medical Association issued the Declaration of Helsinki, which specifically limited its directives to health research by physicians, and emphasized a number of additional conditions in circumstances where "medical research is combined with medical care". The significant difference between the 1947 Nuremberg Code and the 1964 Declaration of Helsinki is that the first was a set of principles that was suggested to the medical profession by the "Doctors' Trial" judges, whilst the second was imposed by the medical profession upon itself. Paragraph 29 of the Declaration makes specific mention of placebos:

29. The benefits, risks, burdens and effectiveness of a new method should be tested against those of the best current prophylactic, diagnostic, and therapeutic methods. This does not exclude the use of placebo, or no treatment, in studies where no proven prophylactic, diagnostic or therapeutic method exists.

In 2002, World Medical Association issued the following elaborative announcement:

Note of clarification on paragraph 29 of the WMA Declaration of Helsinki

The WMA hereby reaffirms its position that extreme care must be taken in making use of a placebo-controlled trial and that in general this methodology should only be used in the absence of existing proven therapy. However, a placebo-controlled trial may be ethically acceptable, even if proven therapy is available, under the following circumstances:

— Where for compelling and scientifically sound methodological reasons its use is necessary to determine the efficacy or safety of a prophylactic, diagnostic or therapeutic method; or
— Where a prophylactic, diagnostic or therapeutic method is being investigated for a minor condition and the patients who receive placebo will not be subject to any additional risk of serious or irreversible harm.

All other provisions of the Declaration of Helsinki must be adhered to, especially the need for appropriate ethical and scientific review.

In addition to the requirement for informed consent from all drug-trial participants, it is also standard practice to inform all test subjects that they may receive the drug being tested or that they may receive the placebo.

== Non-drug treatments ==
"Talking therapies" (such as hypnotherapy, psychotherapy, counseling, and non-drug psychiatry) are now required to have scientific validation by clinical trial. However, there is controversy over what might or might not be an appropriate placebo for such therapeutic treatments. Furthermore, there are methodological challenges such as blinding the person providing the psychological non-drug intervention. In 2005, the Journal of Clinical Psychology, devoted an issue to the issue of "The Placebo Concept in Psychotherapy" that contained a range of contributions to this question. As the abstract of one paper noted: "Unlike within the domain of medicine, in which the logic of placebos is relatively straightforward, the concept of placebo as applied to psychotherapy is fraught with both conceptual and practical problems."

== See also ==
- Academic clinical trials
- Bioethics
- Blinded experiment
- Clinical data acquisition
- Clinical trial management
- Confounding factor
- Experimental design
- Medical ethics
- Philosophy of medicine
- Placebo
- Randomized controlled trial
- Royal Commission on Animal Magnetism
- Scientific control
- Scientific method
