= Unnatural History =

Unnatural History may refer to:

- Unnatural History (album), a compilation album by Coil
- Unnatural History (film), a 1959 Merrie Melodies cartoon
- Unnatural History (novel), a 1999 novel based on the British science fiction TV series Doctor Who
- Unnatural History, a 2023 novel of Alex Delaware series
- Unnatural History (TV series), an American television series

== See also ==
- Unnatural Histories, British television series
- Natural history (disambiguation)
