= Naturalis historia (disambiguation) =

Naturalis historia may refer to:

- Natural History (Pliny) (Naturalis historia), by Pliny the Elder
- Historia Naturalis Brasiliae, by Willem Piso
- Naturalis Historia Scotiae, a 1684 work by Robert Sibbald
- Historia naturalis palmarum, by Carl Friedrich Philipp von Martius

== See also ==
- Natural history (disambiguation)
