= Nature Studies (manuscript) =

Coordinates: 48.2061°N 16.3663°E

Nature Studies (Naturstudien)
- National Library of Austria, Vienna
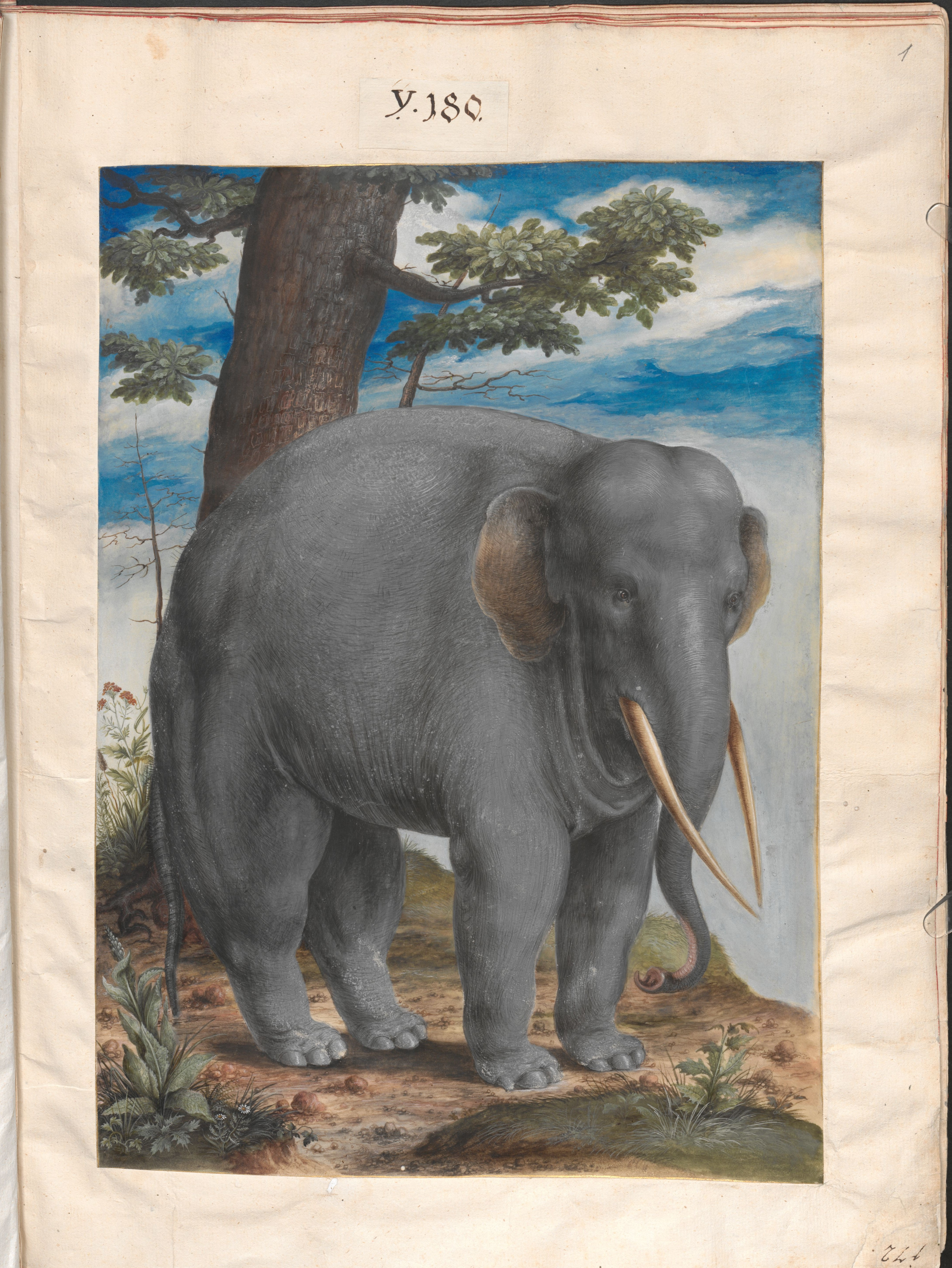
- Drawing of an elephant
- Author(s): Joris Hoefnagel, Giuseppe Arcimboldo, Daniel Fröschl, Ludger tom Ring the Younger, Hans Verhagen de Stomme and Johannes Wierix
- Accession: Cod. Min. 42

Nature Studies is an album or codex containing 170 drawings dating principally from the 16th century made by various artists. The drawings are naturalistic depictions of plants, birds, animals, insects, fish and landscape vedute. The album was compiled in the beginning of the 17th century and was originally in the collection of the Holy Roman Emperor Rudolf II. It is currently in the collection of the National Library of Austria in Vienna.

== Physical description and provenance ==
The codex is made of parchment and measures 48.7 x 36.1 centimeters. The drawings on paper of a smaller scale are glued onto the parchment pages. The drawings are executed in various techniques such as pen and ink, watercolor, opaque white and tempera painting and some with gold highlights. The parchment pages are bound in green leather.

The album passed from the possession of Emperor Rudolf II to the Imperial Treasury, from where it became part of the Imperial Court Library in 1783. The Imperial Court Library later became the National Library of Austria in Vienna.

== Contents ==
The drawings are grouped thematically and include plants, birds, mammals, insects, fish, and natural landscapes. The technique they display is extremely varied, ranging from very simple drawings, through in-depth studies to detailed images. Many of the animals depicted on the album are also included in the Bestiarium or Museum of Rudolf II, which is contained in two albums kept also in the National Library of Austria (Cod. Min. 129 und Cod. Min. 130). Possibly the drawings served as models for the Bestiarium.

== Artists ==
The drawings are made by various artists who have not all been identified with certainty. The attribution of drawings to particular artists is based on the style, inscriptions or signatures of artists. The artists are believed to include Joris Hoefnagel, Giuseppe Arcimboldo, Daniel Fröschl, Ludger tom Ring the Younger, Hans Verhagen de Stomme and Johannes Wierix. They may also include Simon Marmion, Jean Mansel and Alonso Sánchez Coello.

== Gallery ==
Selected drawings in the album

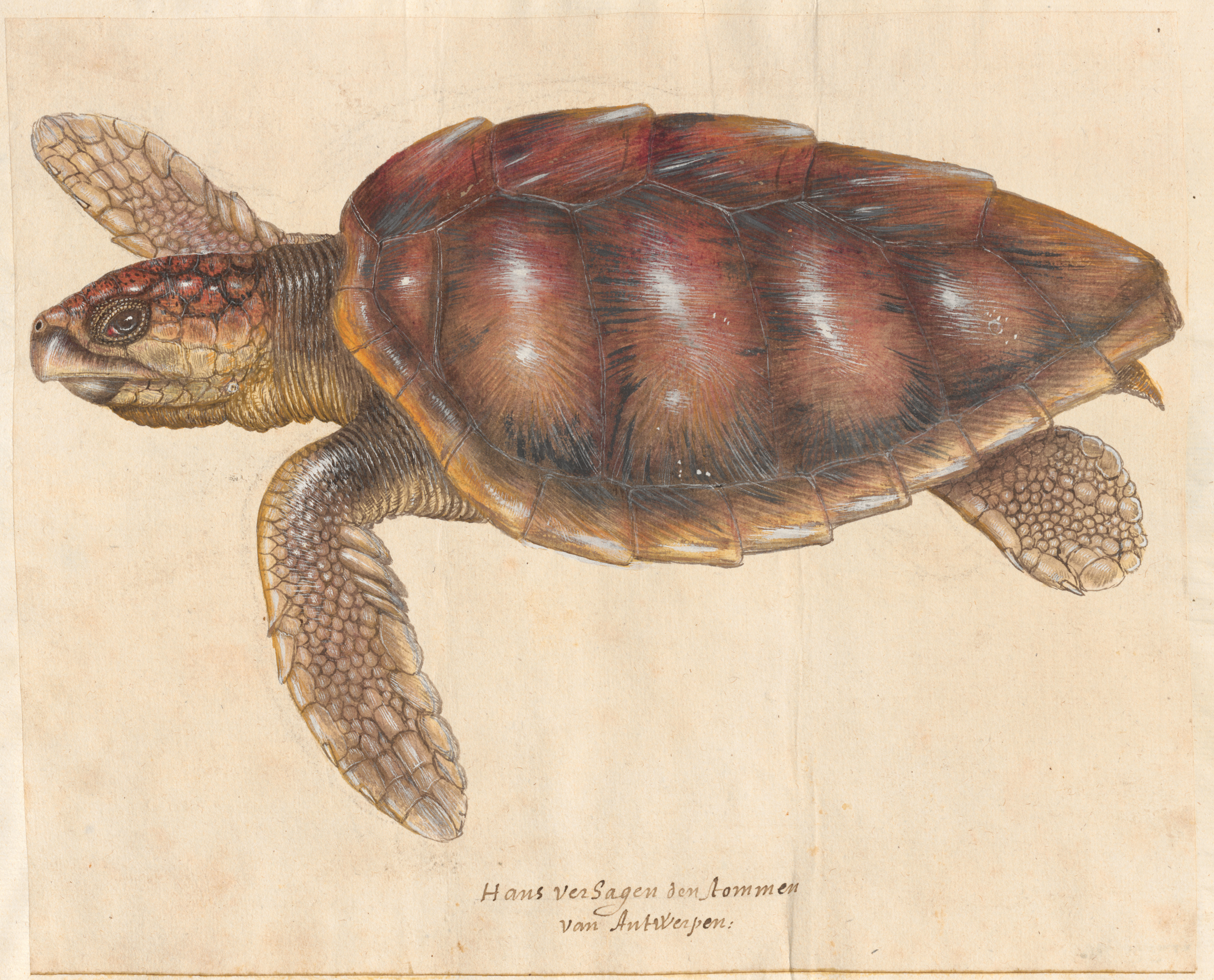
Sea turtle by Hans Verhagen de Stomme

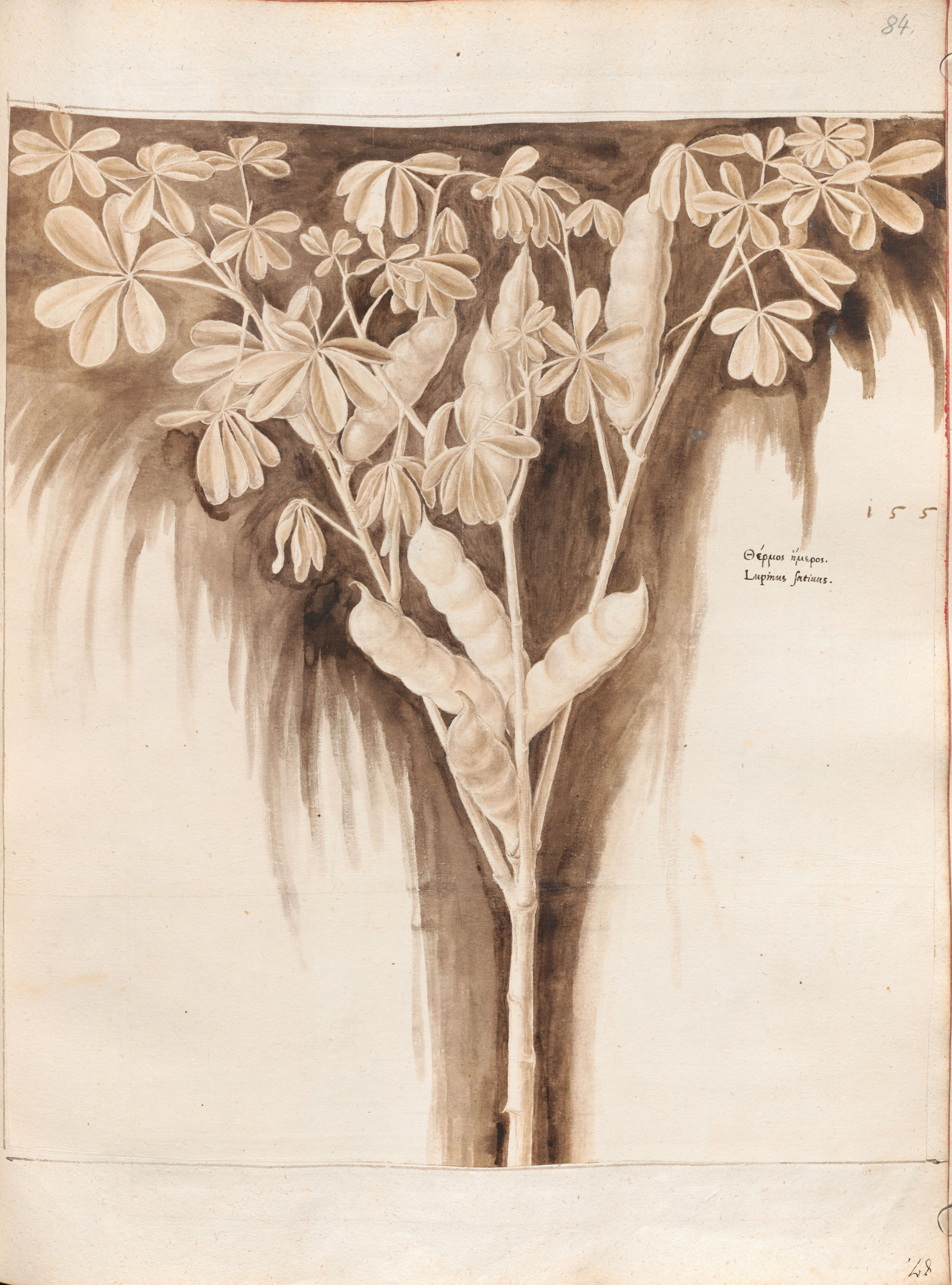
Lupinus sativus

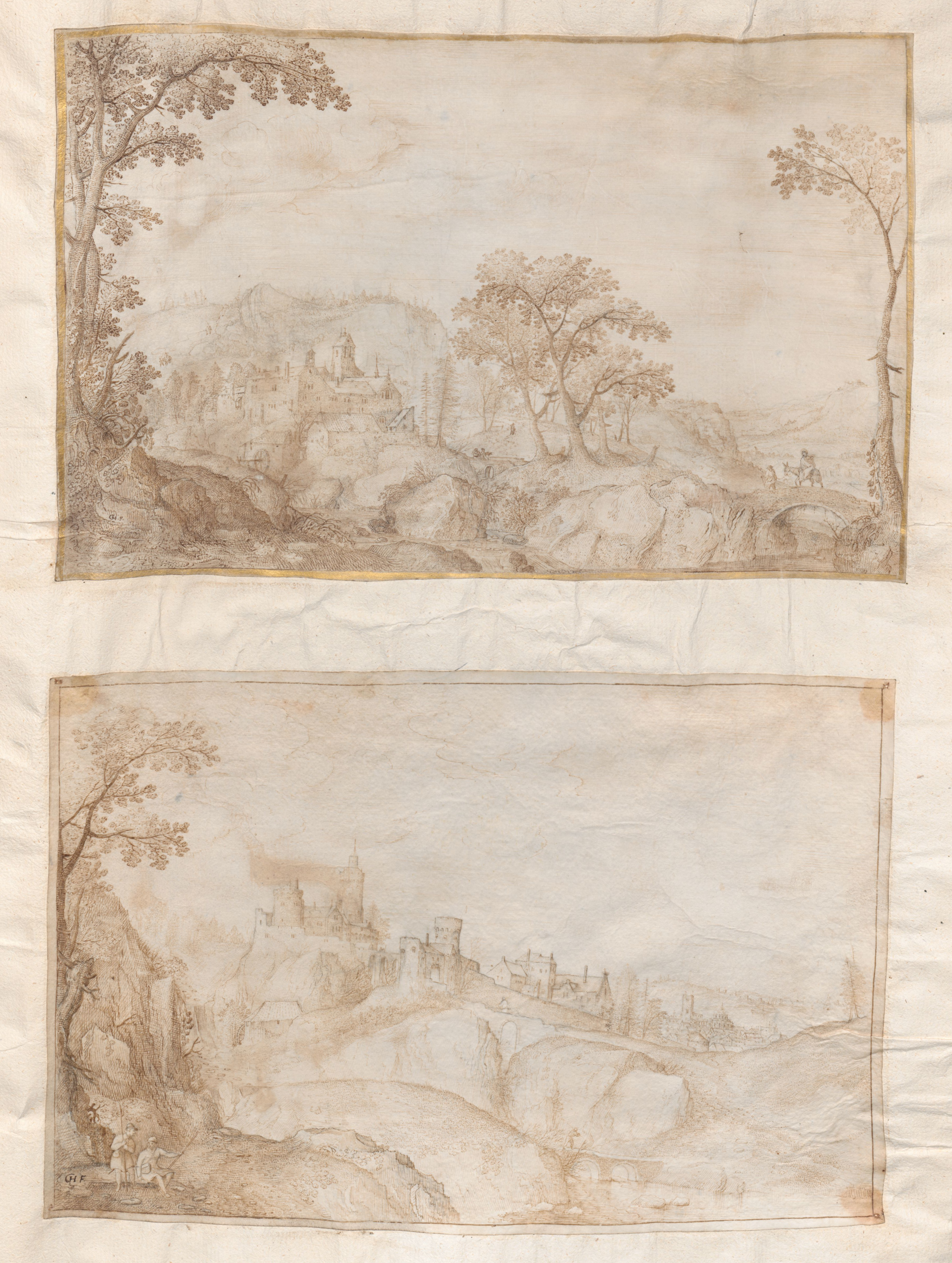
Two landscapes

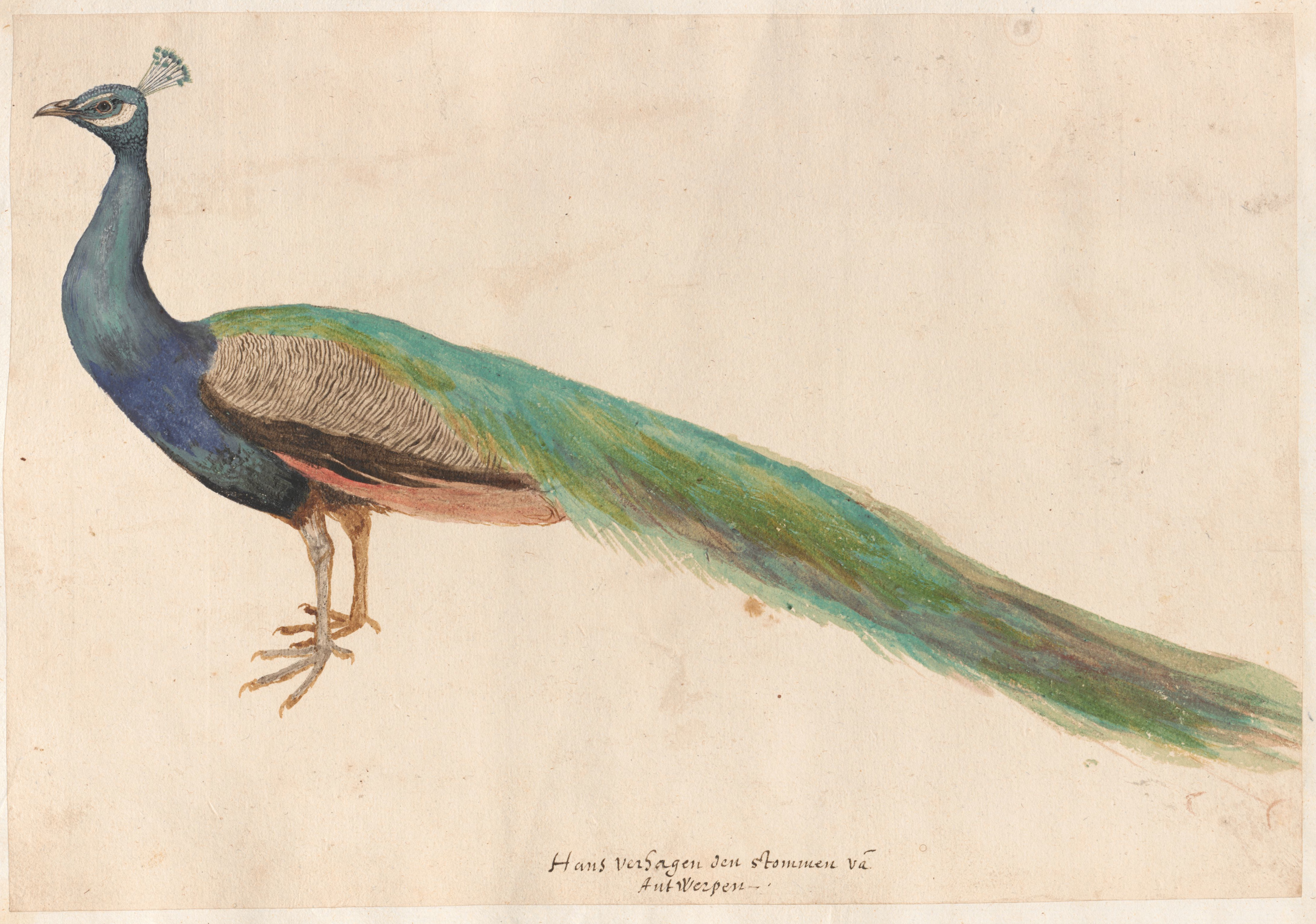
A peacock by Hans Verhagen de Stomme
