= Hans Verhagen de Stomme =

Flemish painter

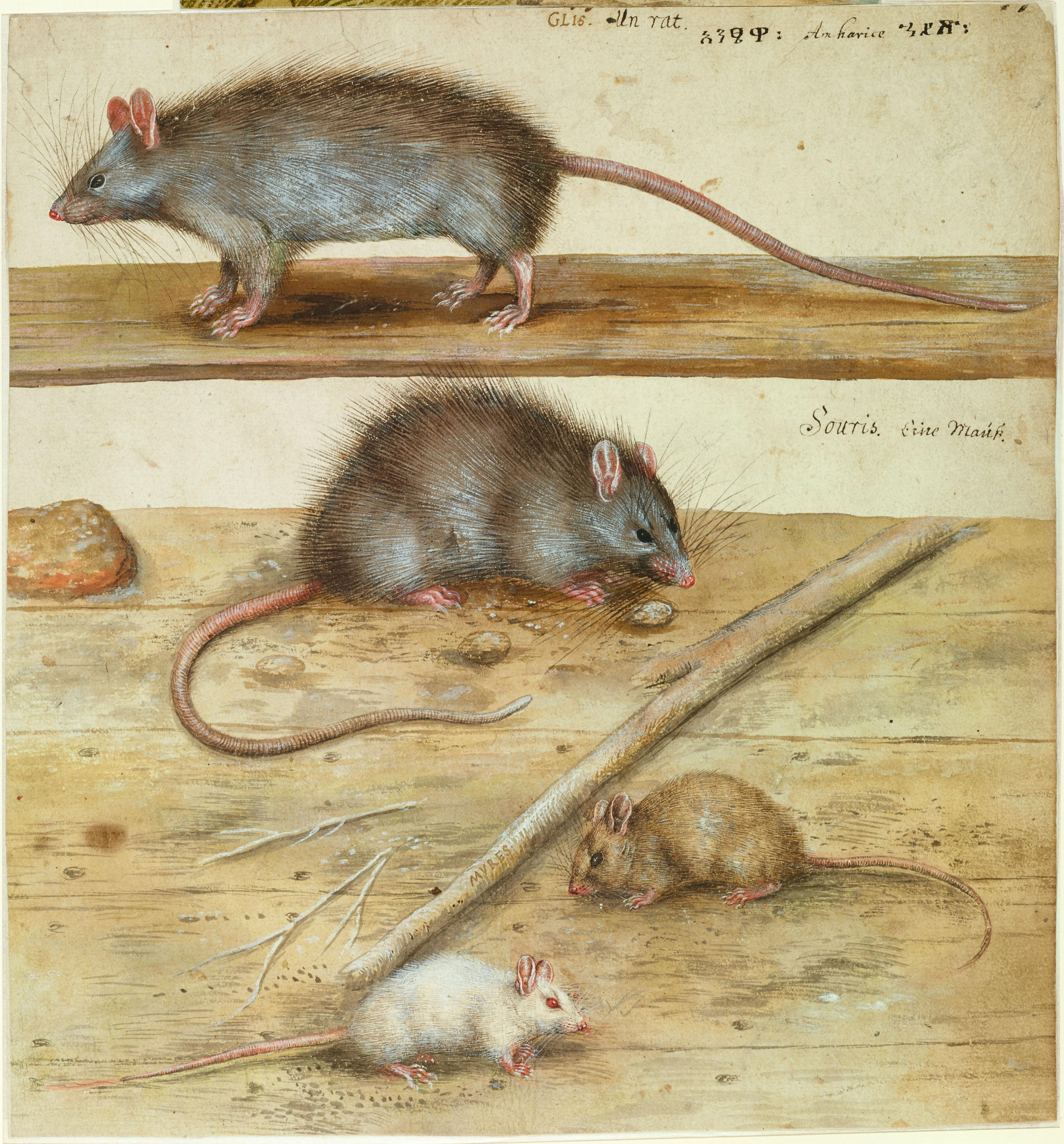
Rats and mice

Hans Verhagen de Stomme or Hans Verhagen der Stomme (alternative spelling family name: Verhaghen) (c. 1540-1545 in Mechelen – c. 1600 in Antwerp) was a Flemish painter and draftsman whose exact drawings of animals were influential on other artists who regularly copied them.

== Life ==
He was born in Mechelen and is mentioned in 1554/55 as a pupil in Antwerp of the Mechelen painter Anthuenes (Anthoni) Bessemer.

It is uncertain whether Hans Verhagen de Stomme should be identified with the Hans Verhagen or Johannes Wraghe (I) who executed in 1576 two paintings, one depicting Moses striking water from the rock and the other the Judgment of Solomon which were made for the town hall in Emden (now in Germany), where they hung until 1944 (now in the Ostfriesisches Landesmuseum in Emden). There was also a painter called Hans Verhaghen from Mechelen who worked around 1600 in Rotterdam and Delft, who is believed to have painted cartoons for the local tapestry workshops. It is not clear whether this person is identical to Hans Verhagen de Stomme.

The latter part of his name 'de Stomme' is a nickname which means 'the mute' in Dutch and may indicates that he suffered from a speech impediment.

== Work ==
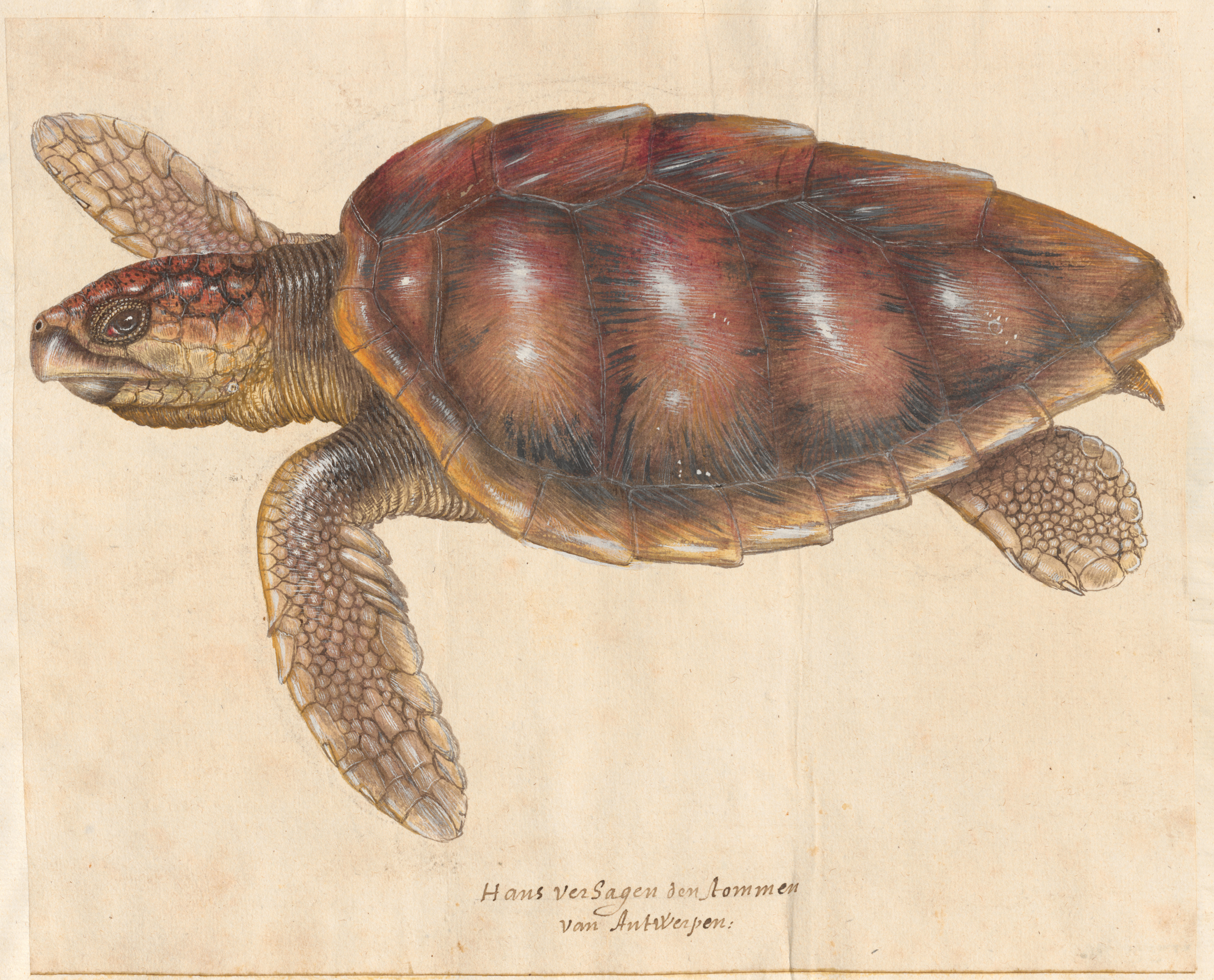
Sea turtle

He is mainly known for his animal drawings. The Österreichische Nationalbibliothek in Vienna holds a codex of Naturstudien (studies of nature) that was once the property of Emperor Rudolf II. Four of the drawings in the folio are inscribed in the handwriting of the Flemish court painter Joris Hoefnagel attributing the drawings to a 'Hans Verhagen den stommen van Antwerpen'. Other than these four studies in the Naturstudien Codex, only 20 drawings by the same hand are known. All these drawings depict animals in nature and are kept at the Kupferstichkabinett in Berlin. One drawing shows the elephant that was exhibited in Antwerp in the autumn of 1563.

Hans Verhagen de Stomme shows very exact observation skills in his drawings. He usually drew animals in their characteristic outline or in complementary views using opaque colours. In his drawing of a stone marten included in the Naturstudien Codex, Verhagen neatly represents the individual hairs of the animal. His works can be regarded as the start of scientific animal illustration in Antwerp. His zoological reliability had a significant influence on other artists, such as Hans Bol and Joris Hoefnagel. Hoefnagel used some of the drawings of Verhagen as models for his four-volume manuscript of natural history miniatures. Anonymous artists working in the later 16th century and the early 17th also copied his work.

== See also ==
- Nature Studies
