= Natural history of disease =

Progression of a person's medical condition

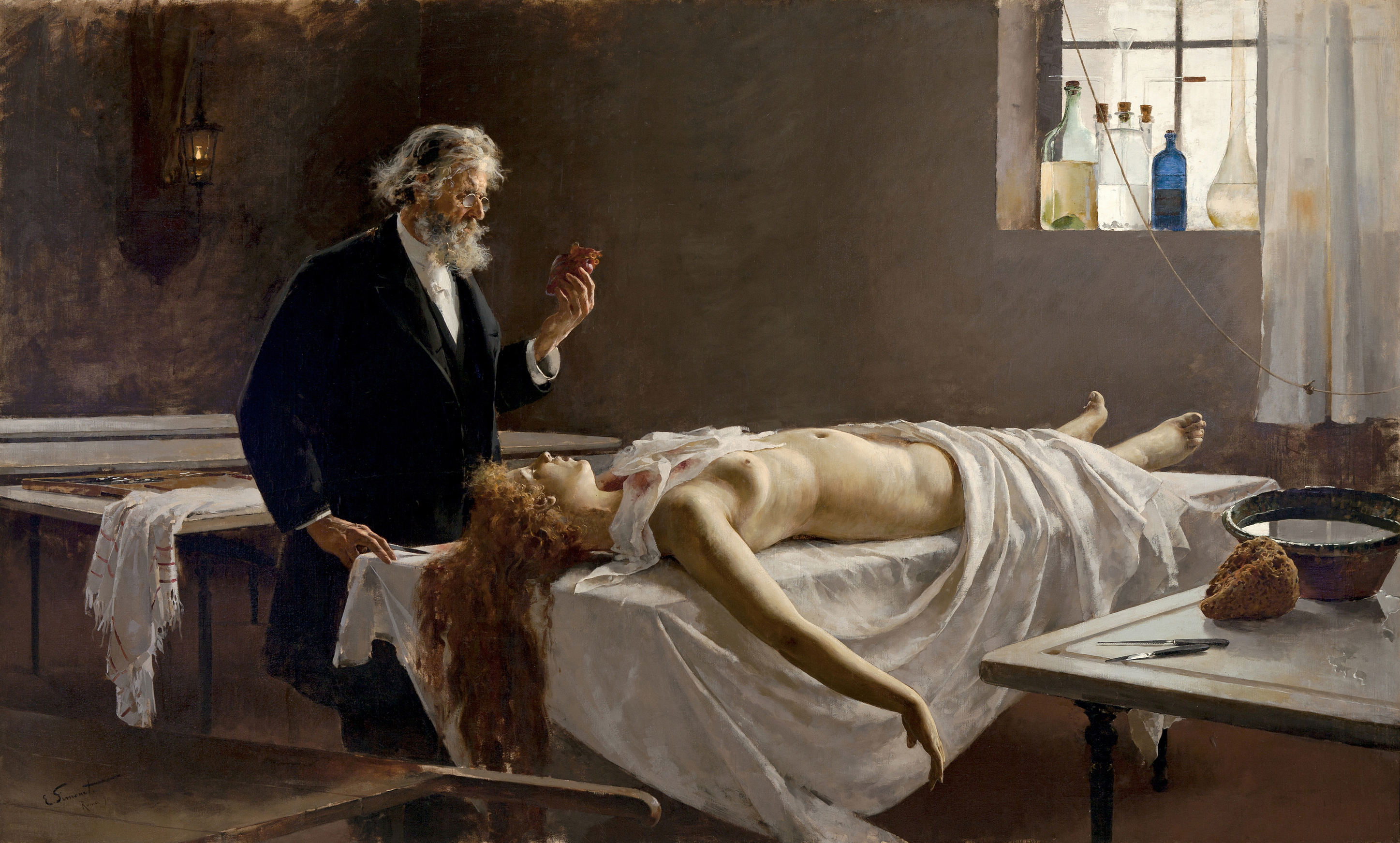
Autopsy (1890) by Enrique Simonet.

The natural history of disease is the course a disease takes in individual people from its pathological onset ("inception") until its resolution (either through complete recovery or eventual death). The inception of a disease is not a firmly defined concept. The natural history of a disease is sometimes said to start at the moment of exposure to causal agents. Knowledge of the natural history of disease ranks alongside causal understanding in importance for disease prevention and control. Natural history of disease is one of the major elements of descriptive epidemiology.

As an example, the cartilage of the knee, trapeziometacarpal and other joints deteriorates with age in most humans (osteoarthritis). There are no disease-modifying treatments for osteoarthritis---no way to slow, arrest, or reverse this pathophysiological process. There are only palliative/symptomatic treatments such as analgesics and exercises. In contrast, consider rheumatoid arthritis, a systemic inflammatory disease that damages articular cartilage throughout the body. There are now treatments that can modify that auto-immune inflammatory process (immune modulating drugs) that can slow the progression of the disease. Because these medications can alter the natural history of disease, they are referred to as disease-modifying antirheumatic drugs.

The subclinical (pre-symptomatic) and clinical (symptomatic) evolution of disease is the natural progression of a disease without any medical intervention. It constitutes the course of biological events that occurs during the development of the origin of the diseases (etiologies) to its outcome, whether that be recovery, chronicity, or death.

In regards to the natural history of disease, the goal of the medical field is to discover all of the different phases and components of each pathological process in order to intervene as early as possible and change the course of the disease before it leads to the deterioration of a patient's health.

There are two complementary perspectives for characterizing the natural history of disease. The first is that of the family doctor, who, by means of detailed clinical histories of each patient, can determine the presence of and characteristics of any new health problems. In contrast to this individualized view, the second perspective is that of the epidemiologist, who, through a combination of health records and biostatistical data, can discover new diseases and their respective evolutions, which is more of a population view.

== Phases of disease ==
=== Pre-pathogenic period ===
In the pre-pathogenic period, the disease originates, but the patient does not yet present clinical symptoms or changes in his/her cells, tissues, or organs. This phase is defined by the host conditions, the disease agent (such as microorganisms and pathogens), and the environment.

=== Pathogenic period ===
The pathogenic period is the phase in which there are changes in the patient's cells, tissues, or organs, but the patient still does not notice any symptoms or signs of disease. This is a subclinical phase that can be subdivided into two more phases:

==== Incubation period vs. latency period ====
In transmissible diseases (like the flu), we refer to this phase as the incubation period because it's the time in which microorganisms are multiplying and producing toxins. It's fast-evolving and can last hours to days.

However, in degenerative and chronic diseases (like osteoarthritis and dementia), we refer to this phase as the latency period because it has a very slow evolution that can last months to years.

=== Clinical period ===
The clinical period is when the patient finally presents clinical signs and symptoms. That is: when the disease is clinically expressed and the affected seek health care. During this phase, if the pathological process keeps evolving spontaneously without medical intervention, it will end in one of three ways: recovery, disability, or death. Additionally, this phase can be broken down into three different periods:

1. Prodromal: the first signs or symptoms appear, which indicates the clinical start of the disease.
2. Clinical: specific signs and symptoms appear, which allows the doctor to not only identify the disease but also determine the appropriate treatment in hopes of curing the patient or at least preventing long-term damages.
3. Resolution: the final phase in which the disease disappears, becomes chronic, or leads to death.

== Types of prevention ==
The medical field has developed many different interventions to diagnose, prevent, treat, and rehabilitate the natural course of disease. In artificially changing this evolution of disease, doctors hope to prevent the death of their patients by either curing them or reducing their long-term effects.

=== Primary prevention ===
Primary prevention is a group of sanitary activities that are carried out by the community, government, and healthcare personnel before a particular disease appears. This includes:

1. Promotion of health, which is the encouragement and defense of the population's health through actions that fall upon individuals of the community, like, for example, anti-tobacco campaigns for preventing lung cancer and other illnesses associated with tobacco.
2. Specific protection of health, including environmental safety and food safety. While vaccinations are carried out by medical and nursing personnel, health promotion and protection activities that influence the environment are carried out by other public health professionals.
3. Chemical treatment, which consists of drug administration to prevent diseases. One example of this is the administration of estrogen in menopausal women to prevent osteoporosis.

According to WHO, one of the instruments of health promotion and prevention is health education, which further deals with the transmission of information, the personal skills, and the self-esteem necessary to adopt measures intended to improve health. Health education involves the spreading of information related not only to underlying social, economic, and environmental conditions that influence health but also to factors and behaviors that put patients at risk. In addition to this, communication about the use of the healthcare system is becoming increasingly more important to primary prevention.

=== Secondary prevention ===
Secondary prevention, also called premature diagnosis or premature screening, is an early detection program. More specifically, it's an epidemiological program of universal application that is used to detect serious illnesses in particular, asymptomatic populations during the pre-pathogenic period. This form of prevention can be associated with an effective or curative treatment, and its goal is to reduce the mortality rate.

Secondary prevention is based on population screenings, and, in order to justify these screenings, the following predetermined conditions defined by Frame and Carlson in 1975 must be met:

1. That the disease represents an important health problem that produces noticeable effects on the quality and duration of one's life.
2. That the disease has a prolonged initial, asymptomatic phase and that its natural history is known.
3. That an effective treatment is available and accepted by the population in case the disease is found in the initial phase.
4. That a rapid, reliable, and easily conducted screening test is available, is well-accepted by doctors and patients, and has high sensitivity, specificity, and validity.
5. That the screening test is cost-effective.
6. That the early detection of the disease and its treatment during the asymptomatic period reduces global morbidity and/or mortality.

=== Tertiary prevention ===
Tertiary prevention is the patient's recovery once the disease has appeared. A treatment is administered in an attempt to cure or palliate the disease or some of its specific symptoms. The recovery and treatment of the patient is carried out both in primary care and in hospital care.

Tertiary prevention also occurs when a patient avoids a new contagion as a result of knowledge that he/she gained from having a different illness in the past.

=== Quaternary prevention ===
Quaternary prevention is the group of sanitary activities that mitigates or entirely bypasses the consequences of the health system's unnecessary or excessive interventions.

They are "the actions that are taken to identify patients at risk of overtreatment, to protect them from new medical interventions, and to suggest ethically acceptable alternatives." This concept is coined by the Belgian general physician, Marc Jamoulle, and is included in WONCA's Dictionary of General/Family Practice.

== Example: Musculoskeletal diseases of senescence ==
=== Pre-pathogenic period ===
Musculoskeletal pathologies such as osteoarthritis of the knee or shoulder (rotator cuff) tendinopathy are aspects of normal human aging. Most humans eventually have evidence of these disease on imaging. In other words, they are diseases of senescence. In a sense, all humans are in the "pre-pathogenic period" for these diseases.

=== Pathogenic period ===
==== Latency period ====
Osteoarthritis and tendinopathy can remain unnoticed (asymptomatic) for years or even decades. For instance, when one shoulder with tendinopathy develops painful movement, imaging of the opposite symptom-free shoulder tends to identify comparable pathology.

=== Clinical period ===
1. Prodromal: The first time a person notices pain or stiffness associated with osteoarthritis or tendinopathy, it may be misperceived as a new pathology and even as an injury.
2. Clinical: There comes a time when the disease is symptomatic on most days and there may be deformity or stiffness (reduced motion). The person is now aware of the changes in their body. This may be a time of seeking medical advice or treatment.
3. Resolution: As with all diseases of senescence, there is an accommodation phase a person redefines their sense of self and no longer perceives the disease as needing active care. Another example would be presbyopia, or the need for reading glasses. Once a person understands that they need glasses to read, they adjust and this is no longer a medical problem.

=== Types of prevention ===
The concept of prevention does not apply to musculoskeletal diseases of senescence, because there are no disease modifying treatments, and the pathology seems relatively independent of environmental exposures such as activity level.

== See also ==
- Natural history – Study of organisms in their environment
- Natural history group – Untreated subjects in a drug trial
- Prodrome – Premonitory signs or symptoms of disease

== Bibliography ==
- Martínez López de Letona J. (2007). La historia natural de la enfermedad como fuente esencial para la formulación del pronóstico (PDF). Madrid: HM. ISBN 978-84-612-7199-3. Archived from the original (PDF) on 2013-08-18.
- Bhopal, R. (2008). Concepts of Epidemiology. Integrating the ideas, theories, principles and methods of epidemiology (2nd ed.). Oxford University Press. ISBN 978-0-19-954314-4. Archived from the original on 2015-04-02.
