= Natural history group =

Untreated subjects in a drug trial

The term natural history group refers to subjects in a drug trial that receive no treatment of any kind and whose illness is, as a consequence, left to run its "natural" course. The term stems from the natural history of an illness, which is the course and outcome of that illness in the absence of treatment.

== First usage ==
In 1863, Austin Flint (1812–1886) in his report of the first-ever trial that directly compared the efficacy of a placebo treatment with that of an active treatment, spoke of "the natural history of [an untreated] disease".

== Third arm ==
The natural history group is often referred to as the third arm of a controlled drug trial, from the simple notion that a trial constructed in this way has three, rather than two arms (the "active" and "placebo" groups).

The observed outcomes within this group are then compared with the outcomes manifested by a group that has been given the active drug, and with that manifested by a second group who have been given a dummy, placebo drug (thus, the natural history group is the trial's "third arm").

Most of our knowledge of the placebo effect comes from the laboratory setting where the experiments are designed to shed light on its neurobiological aspects. Studying the placebo effect in the laboratory setting gives us the opportunity to control psychological and physiological variables, and to rule out possible confounding factors for the placebo effect.

For example, in the laboratory setting it is possible to conduct trials using three randomly selected, equally matched groups:
(1) the natural history (NH) group or untreated group, which receives no treatment of any kind;
(2) the placebo group, which receives an inert treatment that simulates the active one;
(3) the active treatment, which receives the real treatment.

The comparison between the placebo and the natural history group allows us to detect and measure the placebo effect.

== See also ==
- Natural history – Study of organisms including plants or animals in their environment
- Natural history of disease – The uninterrupted progression of a medical condition in an individual
