= Three-Ring Marriage =

1928 film by Marshall Neilan

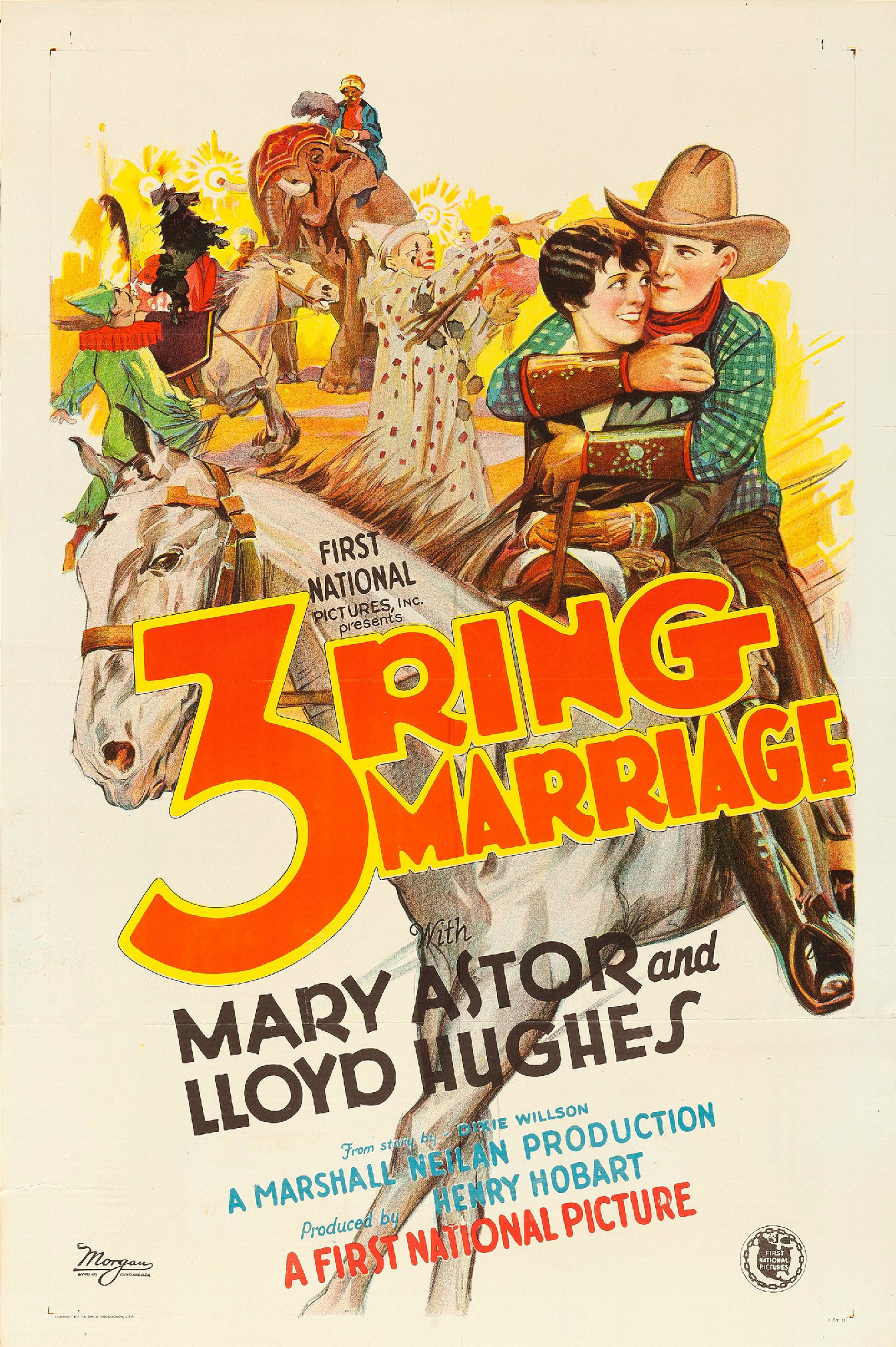
- Directed by: Marshall Neilan
- Written by: Thomas J. Geraghty; Harvey F. Thew; Dixie Willson
- Produced by: Henry Hobart
- Starring: Mary Astor; Lloyd Hughes; Lawford Davidson
- Cinematography: David Kesson
- Edited by: Stuart Heisler
- Production company: First National Pictures
- Distributed by: First National Pictures
- Release date: June 10, 1928
- Running time: 60 minutes
- Country: United States
- Language: Silent (English intertitles)

Three-Ring Marriage also known as 3-Ring Marriage is a lost 1928 American silent drama film directed by Marshall Neilan and starring Mary Astor, Lloyd Hughes, and Lawford Davidson.

== Cast ==
- Mary Astor as Anna
- Lloyd Hughes as Cal
- Lawford Davidson as Souvane
- Yola d'Avril as Minnie
- Alice White as Trapeze Performer
- Harry Earles as Cubby Snodd
- Tiny Doll as Mrs. Cubby Snodd
- George Reed as Valet
- R.E. 'Tex' Madsen as Giant
- Anna Magruder as Fat Woman
- James Neill as Hutch
- Dell Henderson as Gangster
- Rudolph Cameron as Gangster
- Richard 'Skeets' Gallagher as Gangster
- Jay Eaton as Gangster
- Art Rowlands as Gangster
- Howard Truesdale
- Daisy Earles as Minor Role
- George Y. Harvey as Detective

== Preservation ==
With no holdings located in archives, Three-Ring Marriage is considered a lost film.

== Bibliography ==
- Lowe, Denise. An Encyclopedic Dictionary of Women in Early American Films: 1895-1930. Routledge, 2014.
