= Ray Lissner =

American filmmaker

- Born: January 10, 1903; New York City, United States
- Died: April 28, 1944 (aged 41); Woodland Hills, California, United States
- Occupation: Actor
- Years active: 1926–37

Ray Lissner (January 10, 1903 – April 28, 1944) was an American filmmaker who worked during the end of the silent era into the beginning of sound films. He spent his entire career as an assistant director, working with such directors such as Herbert Brenon, Charles Vidor, George Archainbaud, and Otto Brower.

== Life and career ==
Born in New York City in 1903, he began his career in movies with the 1926 silent classic, The Great Gatsby, assisting Herbert Brenon. He would work with Brenon more than any other director, collaborating with him on twelve films. Some other notable films Lissner worked on were: the original Beau Geste in 1926 (again with Brenon); Flying Down to Rio, the first film teaming Ginger Rogers and Fred Astaire; and The Gay Divorcee, again with Astaire and Rogers.

Lissner would die in 1944 at the age of 41.

=== Filmography ===
(as per AFI's database)

Year	Title	Role	Silent (S)/Talkie (T)	Notes
1926	The Great Gatsby	Assistant Director	S	
1926	Beau Geste	Assistant Director	S	
1927	God Gave Me Twenty Cents	Assistant Director	S	
1927	The Potters	Assistant Director	S	
1927	Sorrell and Son	Assistant Director	S	
1928	Laugh, Clown, Laugh	Assistant Director	S	
1929	The Rescue	Assistant Director	S & T	
1930	The Case of Sergeant Grischa	Assistant Director	S & T	
1930	Lummox	Assistant Director	T	
1931	Beau Ideal	Assistant Director	T	
1931	Transgression	Assistant Director	T	
1931	The Gay Diplomat	Assistant Director	T	
1932	Girl of the Rio	Assistant Director	T	
1932	Penguin Pool Murder	Assistant Director	T	
1933	Headline Shooter	Assistant Director	T	
1933	Cross Fire	Assistant Director	T	
1933	Flying Down to Rio	Assistant Director	T	
1934	Red Morning	Assistant Director	T	
1934	The Meanest Gal in Town	Assistant Director	T	
1934	George White's Scandals	Assistant Director	T	
1934	Wednesday's Child	Assistant Director	T	
1934	Where Sinners Meet	Assistant Director	T	
1934	The Gay Divorcee	Second Unit Director	T	
1935	Peter Ibbetson	Second Unit Director	T	
1936	The Return of Sophie Lang	Assistant Director	T	
1936	Lady Be Careful	Assistant Director	T	
1936	Wedding Present	Assistant Director	T	
1937	Her Husband Lies	Assistant Director	T	
1937	She's No Lady	Assistant Director	T	
1937	The Great Gambini	Assistant Director	T	
1937	John Meade's Woman	Assistant Director	T	
1937	A Doctor's Diary	Assistant Director	T	
