= True Heaven =

1929 film

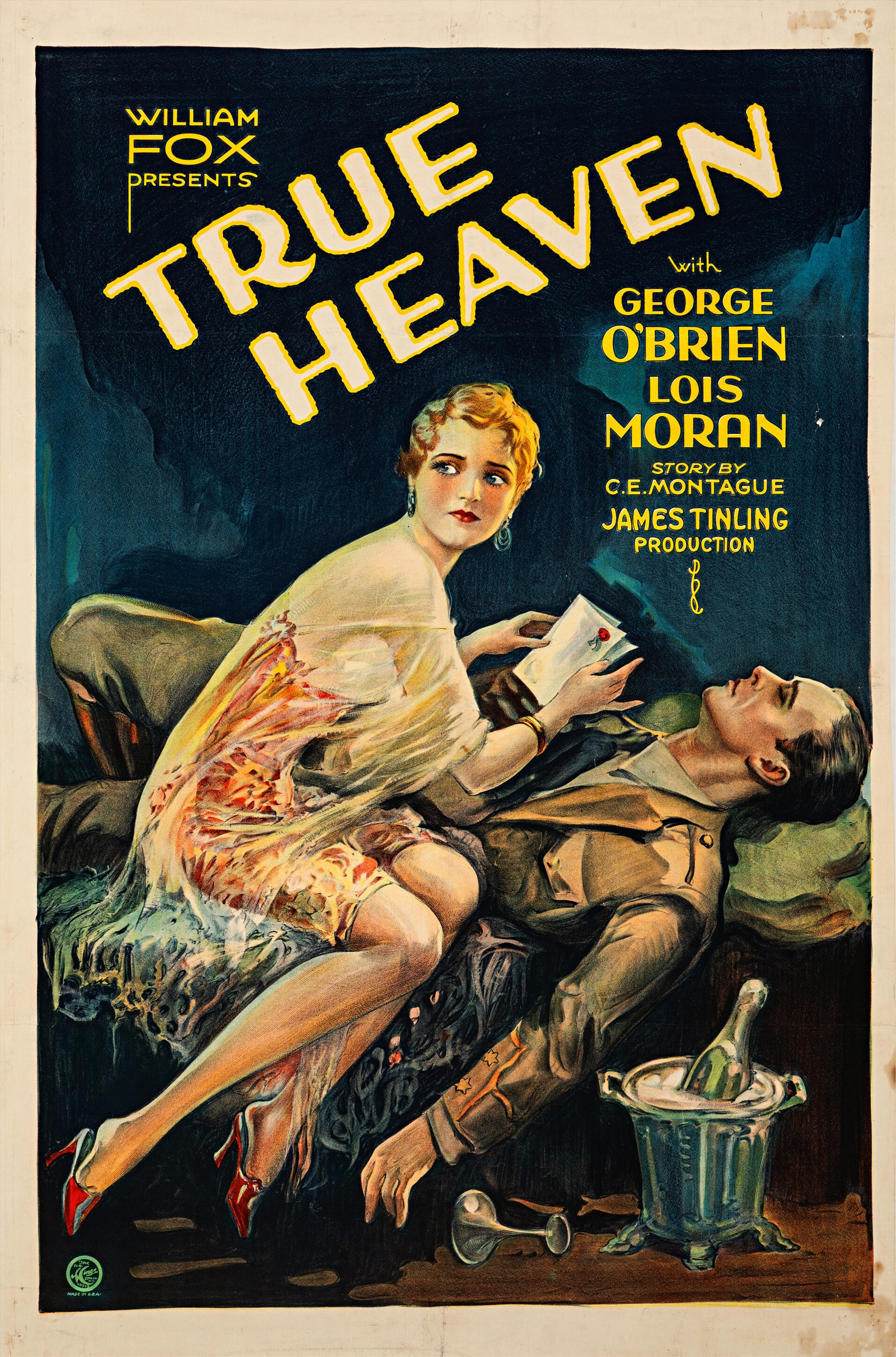
- Theatrical poster
- Directed by: James Tinling
- Screenplay by: Malcolm Stuart Boylan; Dwight Cummins
- Produced by: Kenneth Hawks
- Starring: George O'Brien; Lois Moran; Phillips Smalley; Oscar Apfel; Duke Martin; André Cheron
- Cinematography: Conrad Wells
- Production company: Fox Film Corporation
- Distributed by: Fox Film Corporation
- Release date: February 17, 1929
- Running time: 61 minutes
- Country: United States
- Languages: Sound (Synchronized); English intertitles

True Heaven is a 1929 American synchronized sound drama film directed by James Tinling, written by Malcolm Stuart Boylan and Dwight Cummins, and starring George O'Brien, Lois Moran, Phillips Smalley, Oscar Apfel, Duke Martin, and André Cheron. While the film has no audible dialog, it was released with a synchronized musical score with sound effects using the sound-on-film Movietone process. It was released on February 17, 1929, by Fox Film Corporation.

== Plot ==
In the final months of World War I, the small Belgian town near the Allied front is restless with occupation and the ever-present threat of bombardment. British Lieutenant Philip Gresson, a confident young officer, arrives carrying vital papers for his commanding officer, Colonel Mason.

In the town’s café, soldiers of various nationalities crowd around Judith, a charming entertainer whose youthful innocence hides her true purpose—she is secretly a German spy. Her duty is to lure information from careless officers. Philip notices her almost immediately, struck by her beauty and vivacity, and begins to pursue her.

During an air raid, Philip and Judith are caught together on the street. They take shelter in the rubble of a collapsing building. When the wall caves in, Philip is struck unconscious and badly wounded. Judith, surprisingly tender, rescues him. With unflinching resourcefulness, she cauterizes his wound to save his life. From that moment, Philip believes she is no ordinary café girl, but something finer. For Judith, the situation becomes complicated: while she is sworn to her German handlers, she finds herself genuinely moved by Philip’s gallantry.

Soon after, Judith vanishes under orders from her superiors. Philip, ordered on a new assignment, is instructed to cross into German territory disguised as a Bavarian officer. His fluent German enables him to pass as an enemy officer, but the mission is perilous.

Behind the lines, he again encounters Judith—now operating openly as part of the German intelligence network. Their reunion is charged with conflict: she begs him to flee before he is recognized, but he refuses, determined to complete his mission.

Judith’s struggle deepens. She is torn between her sworn allegiance to Germany and her feelings for Philip. For a brief night they spend together, her loyalty wavers, but when Philip insists on carrying on with his assignment, she makes her decision. She betrays his presence to the German Command, convinced her duty to her country must outweigh her love.

Philip is arrested, court-martialed as a spy, and condemned to die before a firing squad. Judith, wracked with guilt, pleads for his life but her appeals are refused.

On the morning of the execution, Philip is led out to face the rifles. Judith watches in despair. Just as the order to fire is about to be given, a messenger rushes in: the Armistice has been signed—November 11, 1918. The war is over. The German soldiers lower their guns.

Philip is released, and in the aftermath he and Judith are reunited. The war that forced them into opposite camps has ended, and they embrace, uncertain of the future but relieved that love has not been extinguished.

== Cast ==
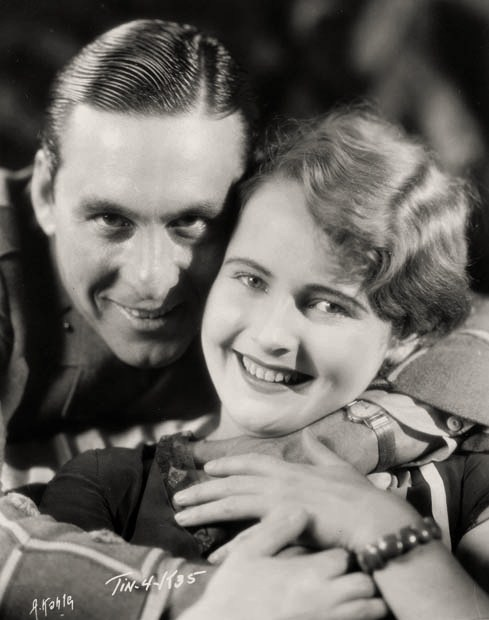
Still with George O'Brien and Lois Moran

- George O'Brien as Lieutenant Philip Gresson
- Lois Moran as Judith
- Phillips Smalley as British Colonel Mason
- Oscar Apfel as German General
- Duke Martin as British Sergeant Major
- André Cheron as British Spy
- Donald MacKenzie as British Colonel
- Hedwiga Reicher as Madame Grenot
- Will Stanton as Gresson's Chauffeur

== Music ==
The film featured a theme song entitled "True Heaven" which was composed by Dave Stamper and William Kernell.

== See also ==
- List of early sound feature films (1926–1929)
