= The Potters (film) =

1927 film by Fred C. Newmeyer

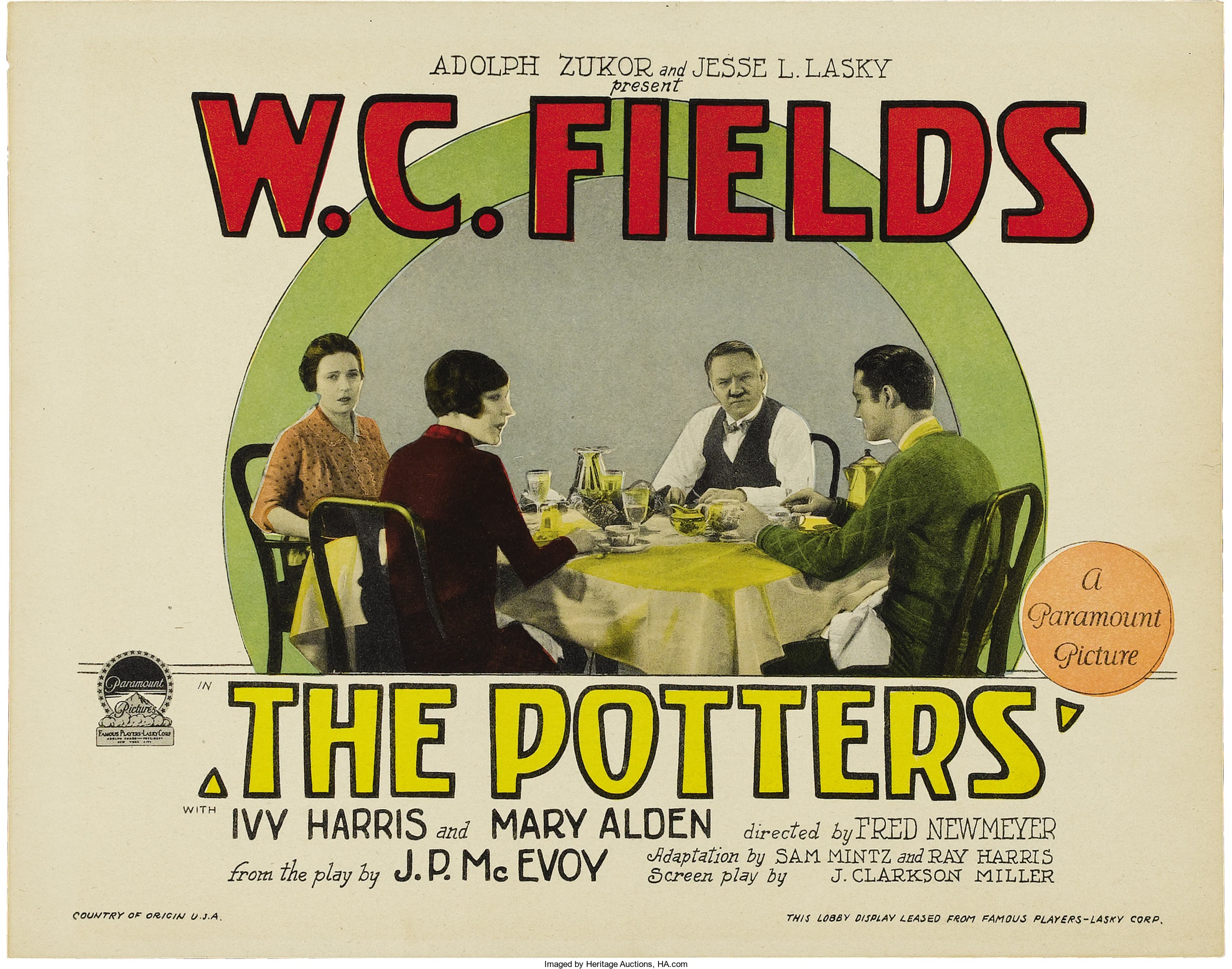
- Lobby card
- Directed by: Fred C. Newmeyer; Ray Lissner (assistant)
- Written by: Ray Harris (adaptation); J. Clarkson Miller; Sam Mintz (adaptation)
- Based on: The Potters by J. P. McElvoy
- Produced by: Adolph Zukor; Jesse Lasky
- Starring: W. C. Fields
- Cinematography: Paul C. Vogel
- Distributed by: Paramount Pictures
- Release date: January 15, 1927
- Running time: 71 minutes; 7 reels (6,680 feet)
- Country: United States
- Language: Silent (English intertitles)

The Potters is a lost 1927 American silent comedy film produced by Famous Players–Lasky and distributed by Paramount Pictures. It was directed by Fred C. Newmeyer and starred comedian W. C. Fields. It is based on a play by J. P. McEvoy which had a respectable run on Broadway in the 1923–24 season.

== Cast ==
- W. C. Fields as Pa Potter
- Mary Alden as Ma Potter
- Ivy Harris as Mamie
- Jack Egan as Bill
- Richard "Skeets" Gallagher as Red Miller
- Joseph W. Smiley as Rankin
- Bradley Barker as Eagle
