= West of Broadway (1931 film) =

1931 film

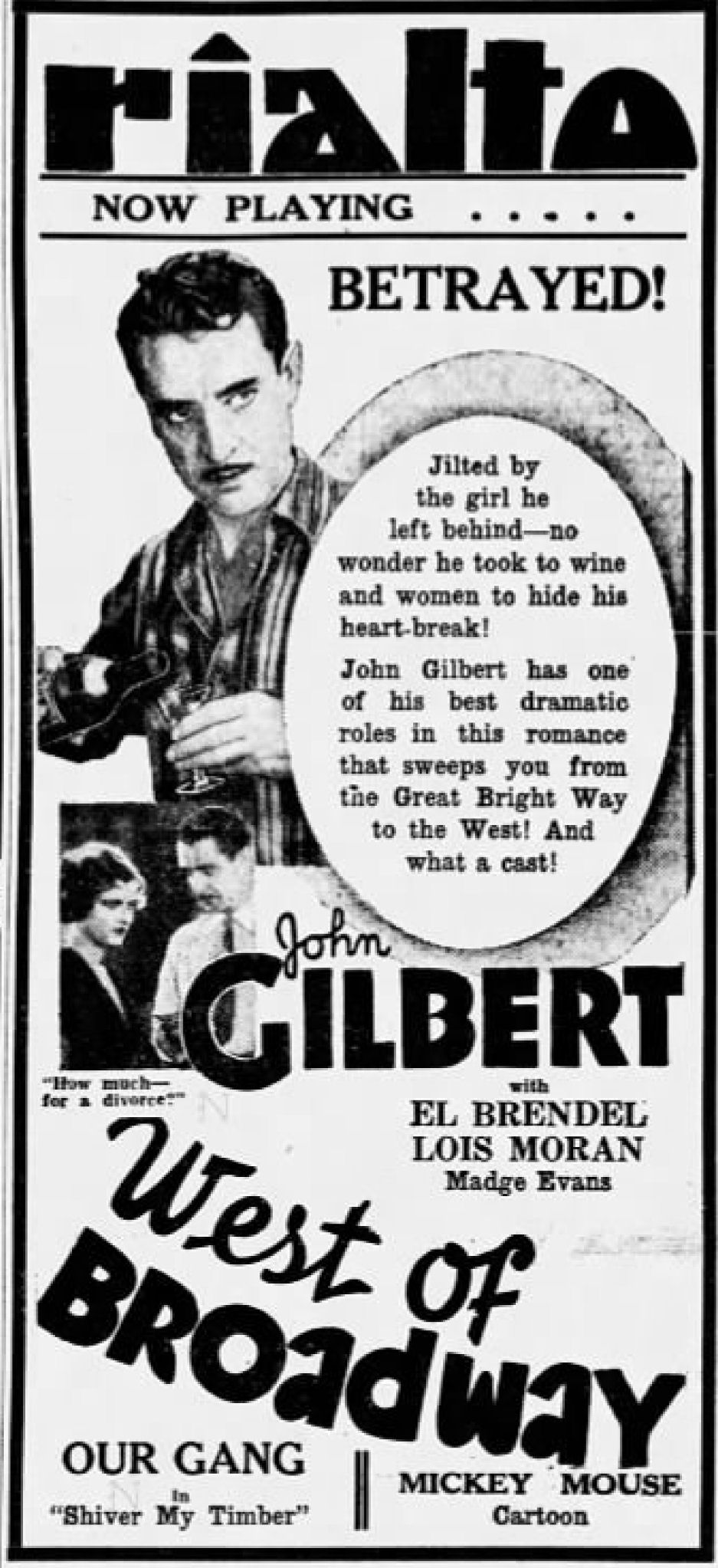
- Newspaper advertisement
- Directed by: Harry Beaumont
- Screenplay by: Ralph Graves; Bess Meredyth; Gene Markey; James Kevin McGuinness
- Story by: Ralph Graves; Bess Meredyth
- Starring: John Gilbert; El Brendel; Lois Moran; Madge Evans; Ralph Bellamy
- Cinematography: Merritt B. Gerstad
- Edited by: George Hively
- Production company: Metro-Goldwyn-Mayer
- Distributed by: Metro-Goldwyn-Mayer
- Release date: November 28, 1931
- Running time: 73 minutes
- Country: United States
- Language: English

West of Broadway is a 1931 American pre-Code drama film directed by Harry Beaumont and written by Ralph Graves, Bess Meredyth, Gene Markey, and James Kevin McGuinness. The film stars John Gilbert, El Brendel, Lois Moran, Madge Evans and Ralph Bellamy. The film was released on November 28, 1931, by Metro-Goldwyn-Mayer.

== Plot ==
Jerry Stevens is a Chicago millionaire whose fiancée Anne falls for another man while Jerry's off to war. Jerry ends up escorting two young ladies, roommates Dot and Maizie, to a party, and when Anne turns up there with her new lover, a jealous Jerry lies and introduces Dot as his new love.

Dot goes along with the gag and has been kind to Jerry all evening, so much so that, after having too many drinks, he proposes marriage to Dot and takes her to a justice of the peace. He wakes up having little or no recollection of what occurred. Recognizing that he has a drinking problem, Dot becomes determined to help Jerry regain sobriety.

Annoyed that she won't grant a divorce, Jerry leaves for a ranch he owns in Arizona, only to find Dot there waiting for him. She doesn't fall for his fib that he is ill and has six months to live. But when he goes to greater lengths to get rid of her, Dot gives up and goes back home, declining his offer of $10,000. Anne is available again, but it gradually dawns on Jerry that the woman he really loves is Dot.

== Cast ==
- John Gilbert as Jerry Stevens
- El Brendel as Axel 'Swede' Axelson
- Lois Moran as Dot Stevens
- Madge Evans as Anne
- Ralph Bellamy as Mac
- Frank Conroy as Judge Barham
- Gwen Lee as Maizie
- Hedda Hopper as Mrs. Edith Trent
- Willie Fung as Wing
- John Miljan as Norm

== Critical reception ==
Variety wrote that the original story "presented possibilities that weren’t at all realized … the result is a totally unconvincing and barely incoherent mass of material." John Gilbert and Lois Moran were described as "far below standard", while the other players were said to have been given too little to do, to make an impression.The Film Daily described the film as "mildly entertaining ... with a weak story that arouses little definite interest in the characters."

Lionel Collier, for the British magazine, Picturegoer, described the film as "weak in dialogue, artificial in plot, and obvious in its conclusions." He wrote that John Gilbert "is very poorly served with material … Considering the handicap under which he labours, he gives a very good performance." Collier commented positively on the performances of Madge Evans, Ralph Bellamy, Gwen Lee and El Brendel but felt that Lois Moran was miscast.
