= Leo Feodoroff =

Russian opera impresario, singer and actor

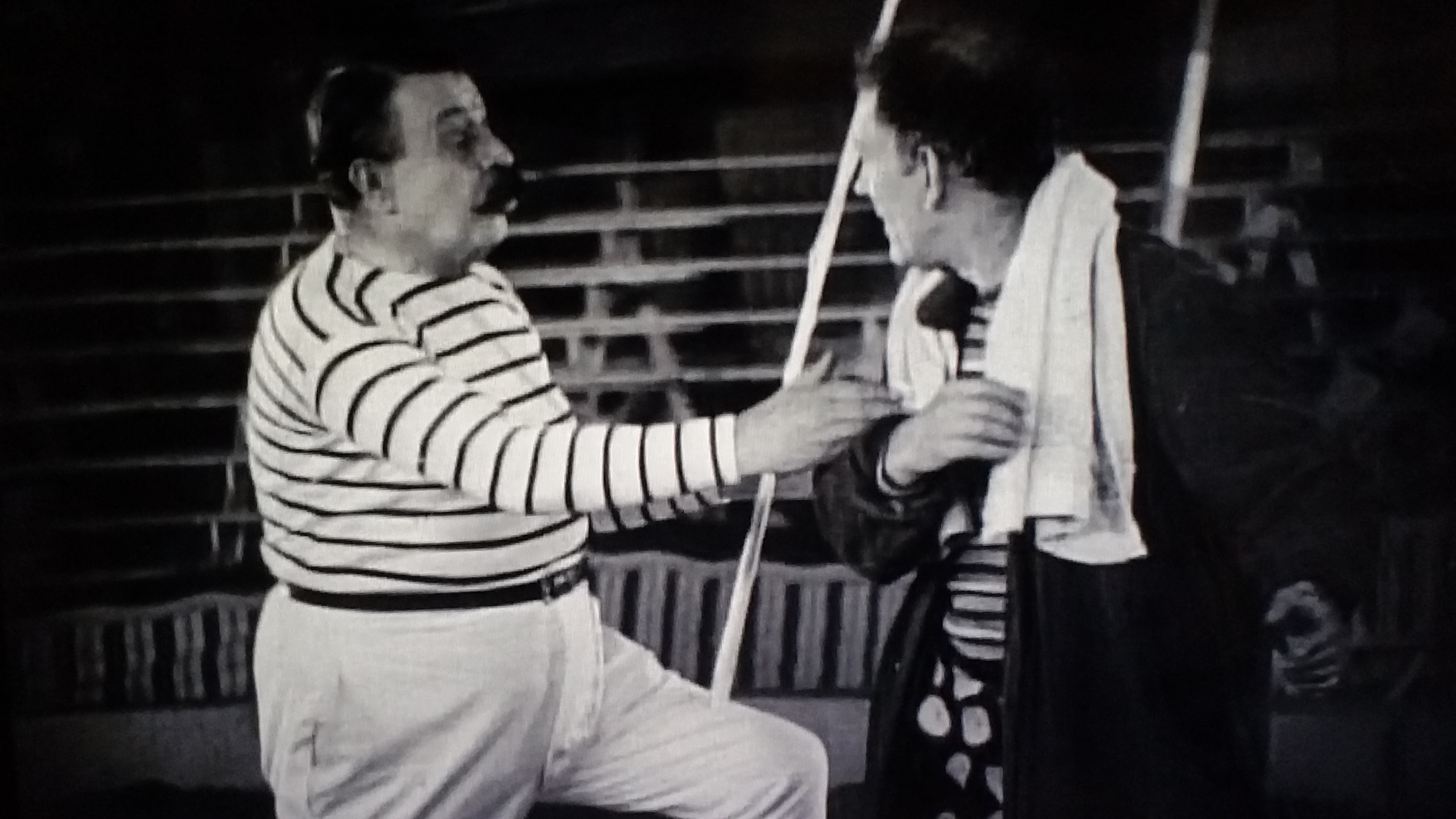
Leo Feodoroff advises Lon Chaney in the 1929 film Laugh Clown Laugh

Leo Feodoroff (1867 - 23 November 1949) was a Russian opera impresario, singer and silent film actor.

Feodoroff was born in Odessa in the Russian Empire in 1867. At a young age, he left home to travel with an opera company. He sang bass in various groups until 1917. In March, 1917, a group of Russian opera stars met at Feodoroff's home in Yekaterinburg following the start of the Russian Revolution. The Revolution had caused many in the group to lose their jobs, and some were there to escape bombings, starvation, or threats. The group, led by Feodoroff, formed a new opera company called the Russian Grand Opera.

As owner and director of the Russian Grand Opera he led the company's tour of Russia and the Far East until the early 1920s. The company traveled to the United States in 1922, first landing in Seattle. During a tour in Mexico, a revolution caused the group to lose their money and equipment. When the company returned from the tour to the United States, it disbanded from a lack of funds around 1923. Afterwards, Feodoroff began acting in films in New York. Around 1926, he went to Hollywood to continue acting. Feodoroff became a character actor in silent films, notably, God Gave Me Twenty Cents (1926), The Music Master (1927), and Laugh Clown Laugh (1929) (with Lon Chaney and Loretta Young). He retired from acting in 1935.

On 12 November 1949 Feodoroff was involved in a car accident. Eleven days later, he died from injuries caused by the accident at Long Beach Hospital, at age 82. At the time of his death, he had one surviving daughter: Anastasia Pressman.

In an interview he recounted his long career in theater, touring outside of Russia, and arriving in the U.S. while Russia was war torn. He said that while the world's operas were translated into Russia and known to him, Russian operas were not well known elsewhere.

== Filmography ==
- God Gave Me Twenty Cents (1926) as Fico
- The Music Master (1927) as Andre Dufour
- Laugh, Clown, Laugh (1928)
