= Cross Fire (film) =

1933 film by Otto Brower

- Directed by: Otto Brower; Ray Lissner (assistant)
- Written by: Tom McNamara
- Story by: Harold Shumate
- Produced by: David O. Selznick; Merian C. Cooper
- Starring: Tom Keene
- Cinematography: Nicholas Musuraca
- Edited by: Fred Knudston
- Distributed by: RKO Radio Pictures
- Release date: 1933
- Running time: 55 minutes
- Country: United States
- Language: English
- Budget: $26,000
- Box office: $98,000

Cross Fire is a 1933 American pre-Code Western film starring Tom Keene and directed by Otto Brower. Produced and distributed by RKO, it cost $26,000 to make and produced a profit of $30,000. The plot follows a soldier who returns from World War I and seeks justice for a man falsely accused of murder. Critical reviews were mixed, with some praising the story and others stating that the action was overridden by the plot.

== Plot ==
During World War I, young Tom Allen joins the French Ambulance Corps. He had been overseeing the Sierra Mining company, but after joining the corps, the board of directors replaces him with Bert King, whose father founded the mine. The board of directors consists of five men: Daniel Plummer, a rancher; Charlie Rudorph, the mayor; Miles P. Styles, a doctor; Whitney T. Wilson, a judge; and Jonathan Wheeler, a banker. As overseer, Bert embezzles money from the company. When he and his friend Kreuger, who is also involved in the embezzlement, send reports of mine losses to the board, the board members grow suspicious. Jonathan Wheeler tells Bert that he will report him, but Bert shoots him and frames Daniel Plummer for the murder. The remaining three board members help him escape from jail and they all become fugitives. While in hiding they rob shipments of gold coming from the mine. Bert, meanwhile, becomes the new mayor.

After a year, Tom returns from the war and becomes a deputy for Sheriff Jim Wells. He befriends Daniel's daughter Pat, falls in love with her, and learns of her father's circumstances. With her help he locates the three men in hiding and encourages them to confess their crimes and face the appropriate legal repercussions. They agree, and upon their arrival in town they discover that Sheriff Wells has been dismissed and replaced by Kreuger. Kreuger arrests them. Tom's friend Ed Wimpy overhears Kreuger's plans to lynch the former board members and warns Tom. While Ed distracts Kreuger, Tom helps the men escape and brings them to Mexico. Bert and Kreuger follow the group, but after Kreuger accuses Bert of being dishonest with him, Bert shoots him. Meanwhile, Tom finds out that Bert plans to ambush them and ruins the attempt. Kreuger, whose gun wound was not fatal, arrests Bert. Daniel's charges for murder are removed, and Tom marries Pat.

== Cast ==
- Tom Keene as Tom 'Jack' Allen
- Betty Furness as Pat 'Mike' Plummer
- Edgar Kennedy as Ed Wimpy
- Eddie Phillips as Bert King
- Stanley Blystone as Kreuger
- Lafe McKee as Daniel Plummer
- Nick Cogley as Dr. Miles P. Styles
- Thomas Brower as Charles Rudorph
- Jules Cowles as Judge Whitney T. Wilson
- Charles K. French as Jonathan Wheeler
- Murdock MacQuarrie as Sheriff Jim Wells
- Tom Kennedy as French Bouncer

== Production and release ==
Production for Cross Fire began in March 1933 and was produced and distributed by RKO studios. RKO claimed the copyright on June 12, 1933. Harold Shumate created the story and wrote the screenplay with help from Tom McNamara, who added further dialogue. Cross Fire was released on June 30, 1933 with a running time of 55 minutes. The last of Tom Keene's RKO Westerns, it is classified as a B film. Production cost $26,000 and the film earned $98,000 in the United States and other countries. After distribution costs the profit amounted to $30,000. It made the least money of the 1932-1933 film season but also cost the least to produce. It did not rank among the top ten films of the season.

== Reception ==
The Film Daily deemed Cross Fire a "swell action story" that would "go big with the youngsters" and "click anywhere". It rated the direction as "very good". According to Variety, the "stereotyped" acting "doesn't matter" in comparison to the film's high-energy action. The magazine also stated that the "dialogue isn't smart but understandable". According to Motion Picture Herald the "preview audience [was] both laughing at and with the picture", which it claimed had "about two cents worth of real story". It also praised Edgar Kennedy's acting in comedic scenes. In a review about fifty years after its release, film historian Richard B. Jewell and RKO archivist Vernon Harbin called it "a dull Tom Keene horse opera" whose "over-elaborate plot" eclipsed the action. Film historian Michael R. Pitts wrote that it "is okay but its plot was nothing new".
