= Don't Marry =

1928 film

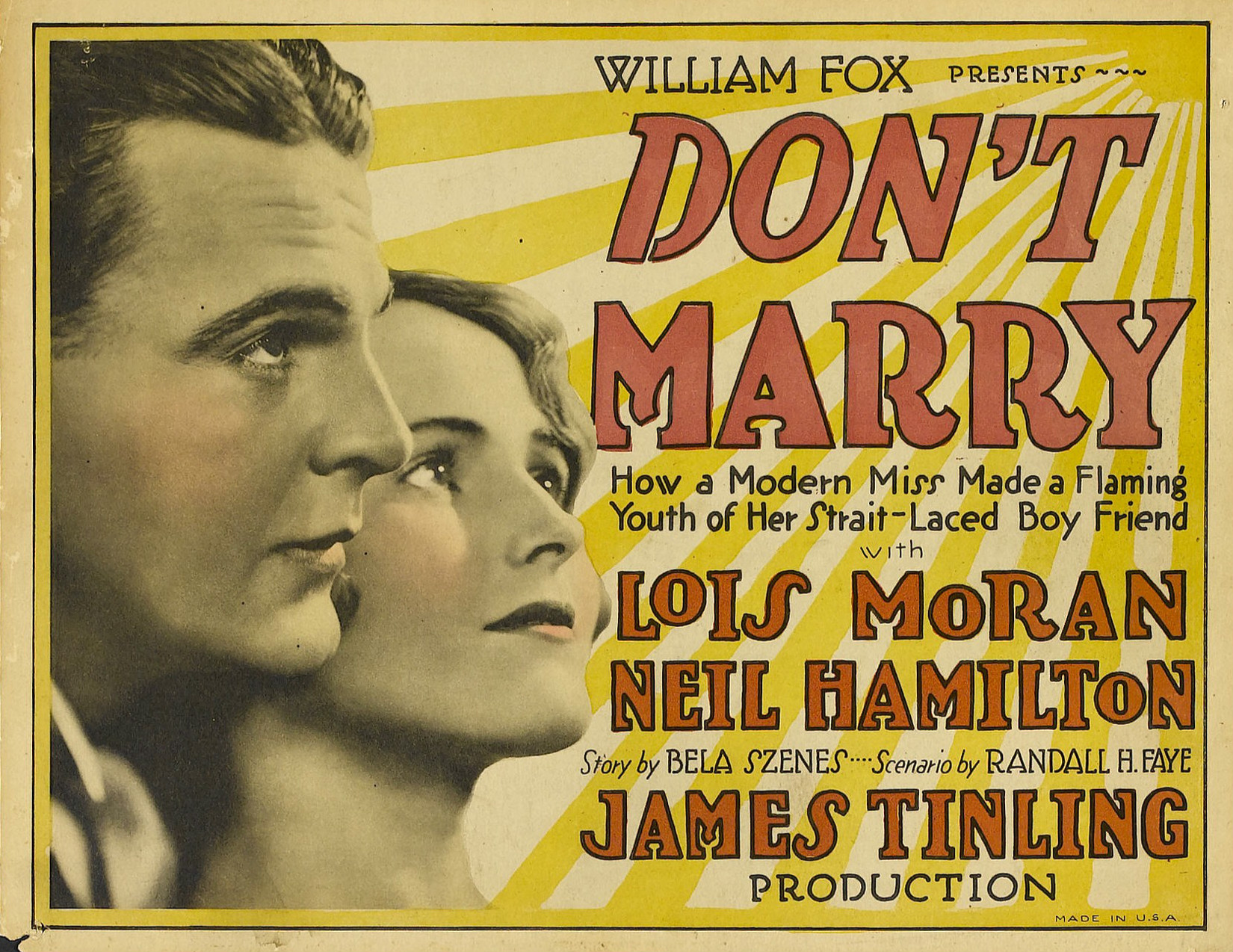
- Lobby card
- Directed by: James Tinling
- Written by: Randall Faye; William Kernell
- Story by: Philip Klein; Sidney Lanfield
- Starring: Lois Moran; Neil Hamilton; Henry Kolker
- Cinematography: Joseph H. August
- Production company: Fox Film
- Distributed by: Fox Film
- Release date: June 13, 1928
- Running time: 60 minutes
- Country: United States
- Language: Silent (English intertitles)

Don't Marry is a 1928 American silent comedy film directed by James Tinling and starring Lois Moran, Neil Hamilton, and Henry Kolker.

== Plot ==
A flapper masquerades as her strait-laced cousin to try and impress a potential suitor.

== Cast ==
- Lois Moran as Priscilla Bowen / Betty Bowen
- Neil Hamilton as Henry Willoughby
- Henry Kolker as Gen. Willoughby
- Claire McDowell as Aunt Abigail Bowen
- Lydia Dickson as Hortense

== Preservation ==
The Library of Congress lists Don't Marry as a lost film.

== Bibliography ==
- Solomon, Aubrey. The Fox Film Corporation, 1915-1935. A History and Filmography. McFarland & Co, 2011.
