= Daisy Earles =

German actress (1907–1980)

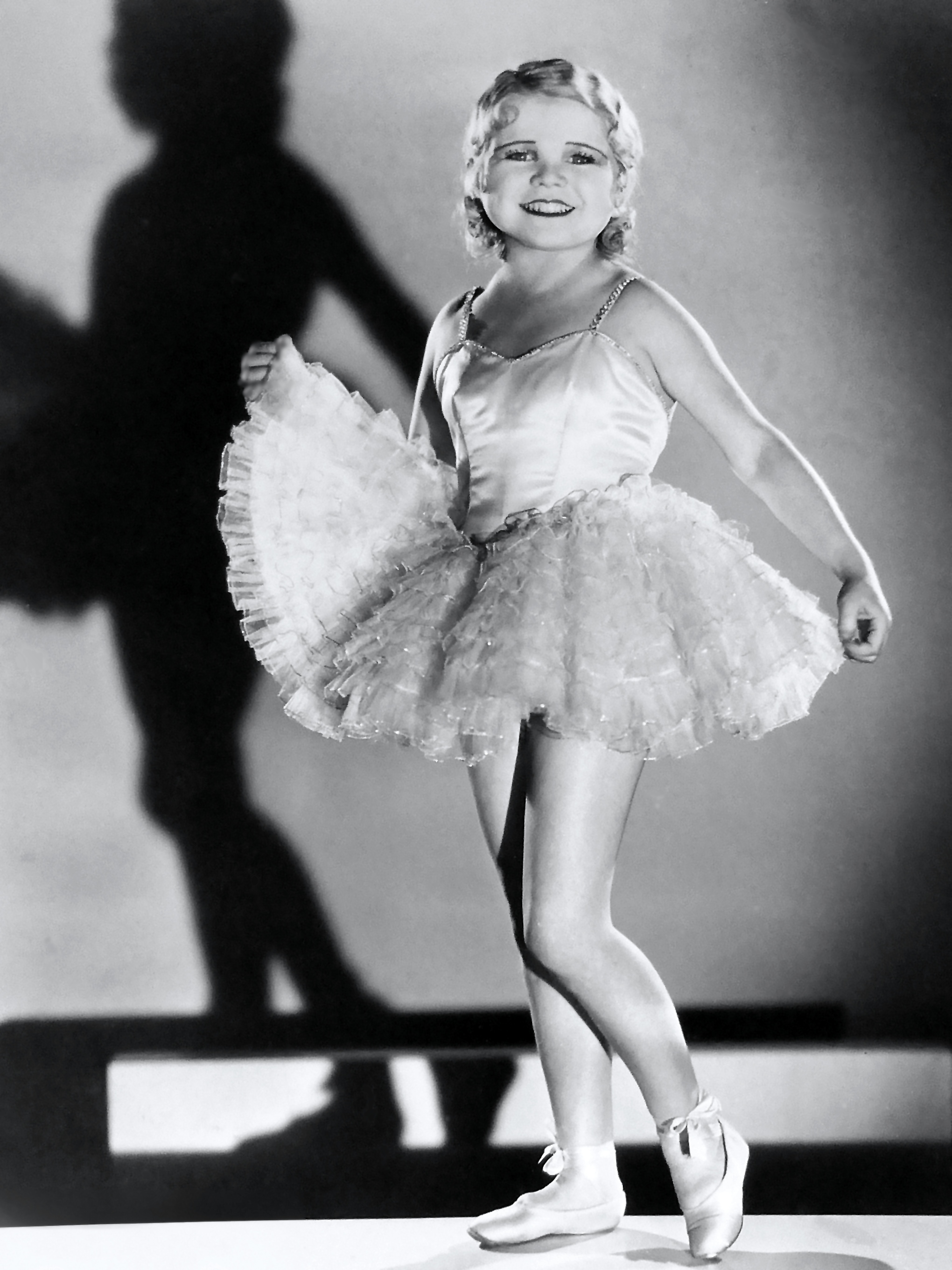
- Earles in a scene from the film Freaks, 1932
- Born: Hilda Emma Schneider; April 29, 1907; Stolpen, Germany
- Died: March 15, 1980 (aged 72); Sarasota, Florida, United States
- Occupations: Actress; circus performer
- Years active: 1920–1958
- Known for: Films Freaks and The Wizard of Oz
- Height: 39 in (99 cm)
- Relatives: Tiny Earles (sister); Gracie Earles (sister); Harry Earles (brother)

Hilda Emma Schneider (April 29, 1907 – March 15, 1980), who went by the stage name Daisy Earles, was a German-born actress with dwarfism who migrated to the United States in the early 1920s. She worked in Hollywood films and later toured with circus companies with her siblings under the name of The Doll Family. Daisy Earles was blonde, pretty, and tall compared to her sisters, and had a very well proportioned figure, for which she earned the epithet of a "miniature Mae West". Her circus acts with her siblings were primarily as "parade performers".

== Early life ==
Hilda Emma Schneider was born on April 29, 1907, in Stolpen, Kingdom of Saxony, German Empire, to Gustav and Emma Schneider. She was one of four siblings with dwarfism, alongside Frieda, Kurt and Elly Schneider, who later became known professionally as Gracie, Harry and Tiny Earles.

In 1916, when Daisy was nine years old, her older siblings Kurt and Frieda emigrated to California after meeting theatrical manager Bert W. Earles, who became their agent. They adopted the stage names Harry and Gracie Earles and began performing professionally. In the early 1920s, while still in her teens, Daisy emigrated to California. Her younger sister Elly followed in 1926, when Daisy was 19 years old. By then, all four siblings were performing under the stage surname Earles, which they later changed to Doll following the death of their manager.

== Career ==
Their first dance appearance was for the Buffalo Bill Show in the roles as "Hansel and Gretel" for which they were hailed as the "Smallest Dancing Couple in the World".

Earles was most well known for her part in Freaks in 1932. However, the film was considered horrifying and was shown in the U.S. with many cuts, banned in England, and in Canada was called "brutal and grotesque".

In 1928, Earles had appeared in the 1928 film Three-Ring Marriage. She and her siblings Tiny, Grace, and Harry, performed as "Munchkins" in a song and dance sequence along the Yellow Brick Road, in The Wizard of Oz (1939). They were not credited individually in the film, but as "The Singer Midgets", despite having been generally well known as "The Doll Family". She had a small uncredited role in 1952's The Greatest Show on Earth, for which she won an award for her "blink-and-you-miss-it" photo shot.

Daisy retired from film acting in 1952, after her bit part in The Greatest Show on Earth. She and her siblings continued working for the Ringling Brothers Circus and Barnum and Bailey Circus where they appeared as "parade performers" in "side shows for 30 seasons". They all retired in 1958.

Following retirement, Daisy lived in Sarasota, Florida with her three siblings. Subsequent to Daisy's death in March 1980 at the age of 72, three documentaries dedicated to her and her siblings were released. These are: Freaks Uncensored! (1999), Ce nain que je ne saurais voir! (2015, a TV film), and Schlitzie: One of Us (2015). In one, it is stated that Franz Taibosh had romantic interest in her, but she was not interested as she was already married to her husband, who also worked as a chauffeur and security person for her family.

== Bibliography ==
- Eagan, Daniel (2010). America's Film Legacy: The Authoritative Guide to the Landmark Movies in the National Film Registry. A&C Black. ISBN 978-0-8264-2977-3.
- Kérchy, Anna; Zittlau, Andrea (2013). Exploring the Cultural History of Continental European Freak Shows and 'Enfreakment'. Cambridge Scholars Publishing. ISBN 978-1-4438-4642-4.
- Parsons, Neil; Smith, Alexander McCall (2010). Clicko: The Wild Dancing Bushman. University of Chicago Press. ISBN 978-0-226-64742-5.
- Paszylk, Barthomiej (2009). The Pleasure and Pain of Cult Horror Films: An Historical Survey. McFarland. ISBN 978-0-7864-5327-6.
- Senn, Bryan (2006). Golden Horrors: An Illustrated Critical Filmography of Terror Cinema, 1931–1939. McFarland. ISBN 978-0-7864-2724-6.
