= Words and Music (1929 film) =

1929 film

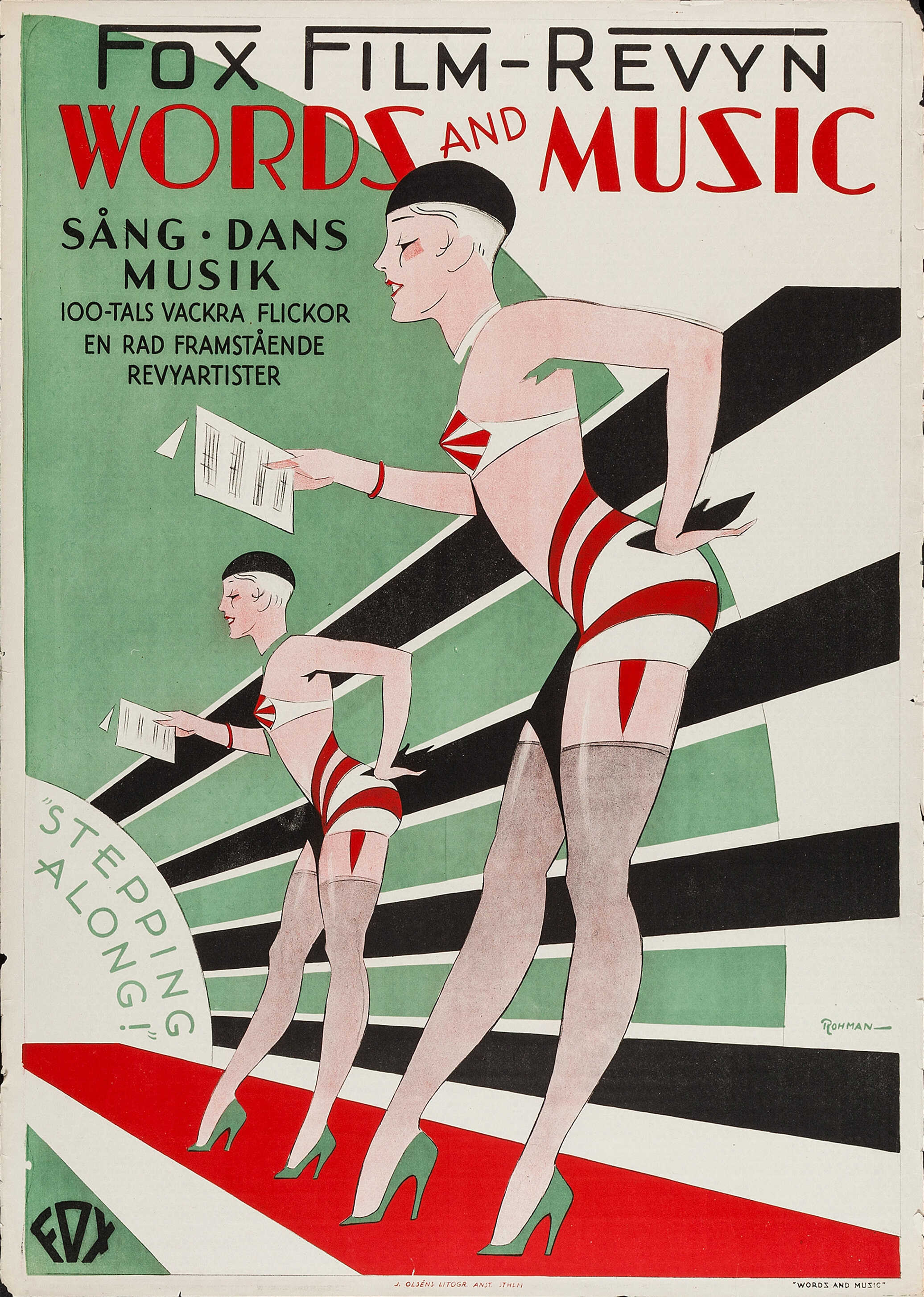
- Swedish theatrical release poster
- Directed by: James Tinling
- Written by: Frederick Hazlitt Brennan (story); Jack McEdwards (story); Andrew Bennison
- Produced by: William Fox
- Starring: Lois Moran; David Percy; Helen Twelvetrees; Frank Albertson; Duke Morrison
- Cinematography: Don Anderson; Charles G. Clarke; Charles Van Enger
- Edited by: Ralph Dixon
- Music by: Con Conrad; Archie Gottler; Sidney D. Mitchell; Dave Stamper
- Distributed by: Fox Film Corporation
- Release date: August 18, 1929
- Running time: 72 minutes
- Country: United States
- Language: English

Words and Music is a 1929 American sound (All-Talking) pre-Code musical comedy film directed by James Tinling and starring Lois Moran, Helen Twelvetrees and Frank Albertson. It was written by Andrew Bennison, with the story by Frederick Hazlitt Brennan and Jack Edwards.

Released by Fox Film Corporation, the film is notable as the first in which John Wayne is credited as "Duke Morrison". Wayne was also credited as "Duke Morrison" as a property assistant in the Art Department. Ward Bond, Wayne's lifelong good friend, also had a bit part in the movie. Words and Music, which was also released as a silent film, is now considered lost.

== Plot ==
Two young college students, Phil and Pete, compete for the love of a pretty girl named Mary, and also to win the $1500 prize in a song-writing contest to write the best show tune for the annual college revue. The two men each ask Mary to sing for them, but eventually, she chooses Phil as her beau, and it is he who also has the winning song.

== Cast ==
- Lois Moran as Mary Brown
- David Percy as Phil
- Helen Twelvetrees as Dorothy Blake
- William Orlamond as Pop Evans
- Elizabeth Patterson as Dean Crockett
- John Wayne (credited as Duke Morrison) as Pete Donahue
- Frank Albertson as Skeet Mulroy
- Tom Patricola as Hannibal

== Production ==
Although the film was largely devoid of much of a plot line, as was typical of musical revue pictures of the period, there is a great deal of singing and dancing. Many of Lois Moran's numbers were footage that was cut from the film, Fox Movietone Follies of 1929, to make that film shorter. This film was created to make use of the deleted scenes, so it was fashioned around Moran's singing talent. Songs include, "Too Wonderful for Words" (William Kernell, Dave Stamper, Paul Gerard Smith, Edmund Joseph), "Stepping Along" (Kernell), "Shadows" (Con Conrad, Sidney D. Mitchell, Archie Gottler).

== See also ==
- John Wayne filmography
- List of early sound feature films (1926–1929)
