= Lois Moran =

American actress (1909–1990)

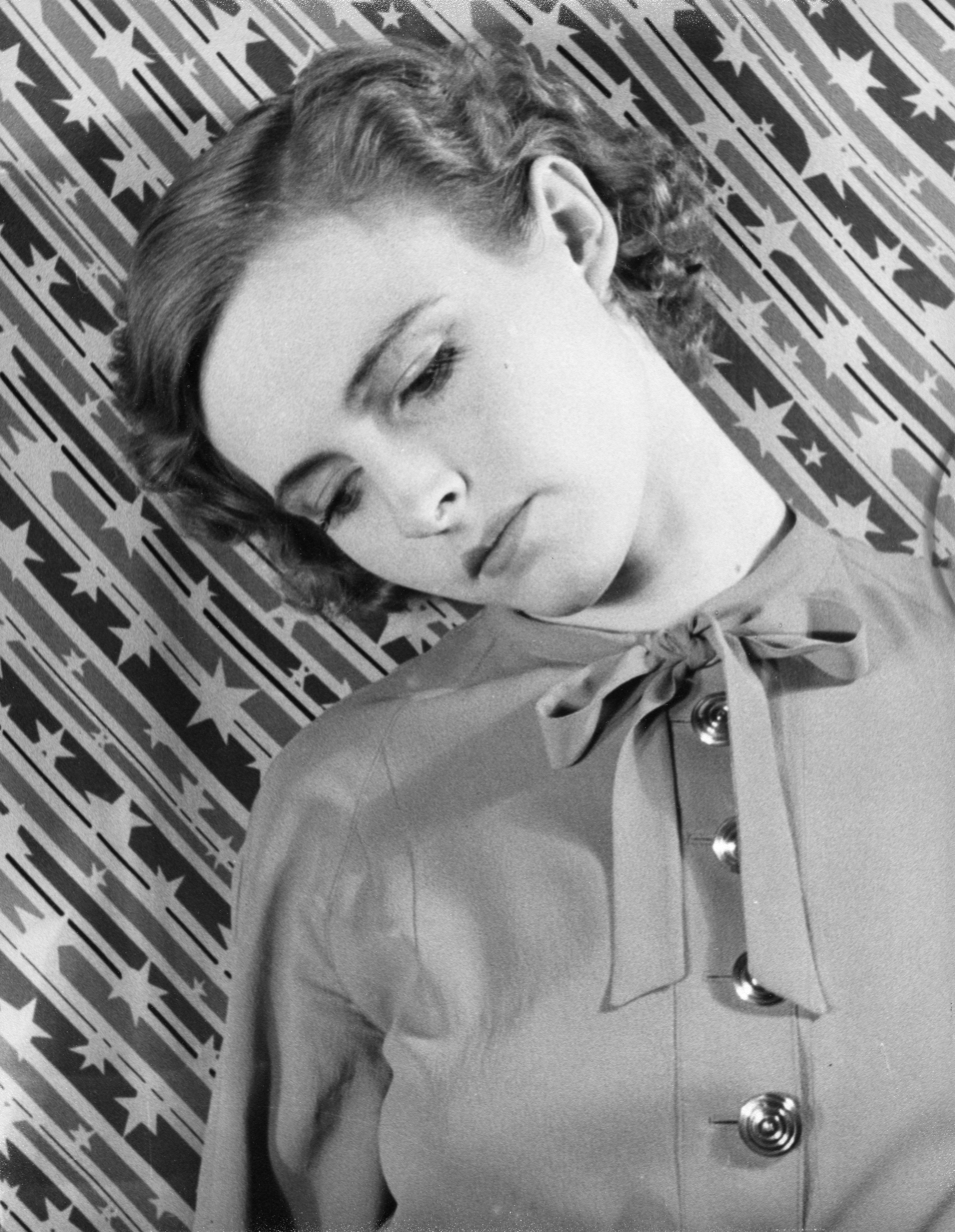
- Portrait of Moran by Carl Van Vechten, 1932
- Born: Lois Darlington Dowling; March 1, 1909; Pittsburgh, Pennsylvania, U.S.
- Died: July 13, 1990 (aged 81); Sedona, Arizona, U.S.
- Occupation: Actress
- Years active: 1923–1974
- Spouse: Clarence M. Young (m. 1935; died 1973)
- Children: 1

Lois Moran (born Lois Darlington Dowling; March 1, 1909 – July 13, 1990) was an American film and stage actress.

== Early life ==
Moran was born in Pittsburgh, Pennsylvania, the daughter of Roger Dowling and Gladys Evans Dowling. When Moran was one year old, her father died in an automobile accident. A few years later, her mother married Dr. Timothy Moran. She suffered a second loss at age nine, when her stepfather (whom she later described as "my dearest person in the world next to mother") died from influenza.

She attended Seton Hill Academy in Greensburg, Pennsylvania. In 1921, when Lois was 12, she and her mother moved to Paris, France, with funding provided by Lois's great-aunt.

== Stage ==
Moran's stage activities included singing and dancing at the Paris National Opera when she was 13 years old.

Her Broadway credits include Of Thee I Sing (1931) and This Is New York (1930).

== Film ==
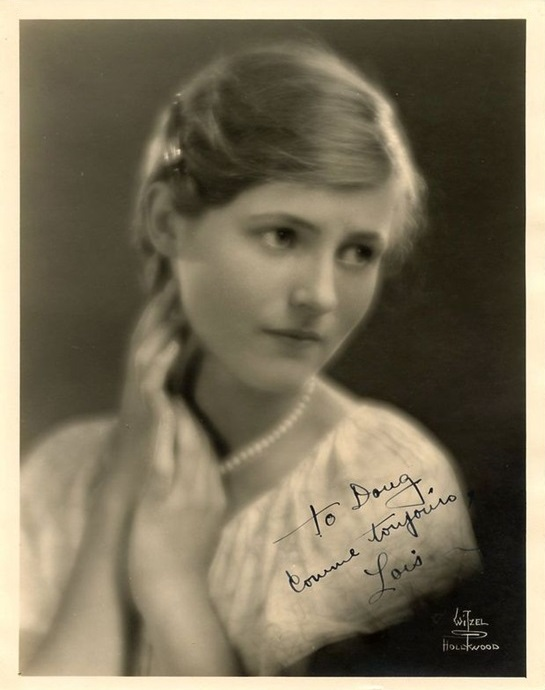
Moran in the 1920s

Moran's film career began when she made her first film in Paris at age 14. She is probably best known for her role as Laurel Dallas, daughter of the title character, in the 1925 film Stella Dallas, which was her Hollywood film debut.

She appeared in early sound movies, such as Behind That Curtain (1929), and some musical movies, such as A Song of Kentucky (1929), Words and Music (1929), and Mammy (1930). She then moved to Broadway, where she appeared in the play This Is New York (1930) and the musicals Of Thee I Sing (1933) and Let 'Em Eat Cake (1934).

== Television ==
Moran also had a co-starring role in the short-lived TV series Waterfront (1954–1955). It starred Preston Foster as Capt. John Herrick and Moran as his wife, May Herrick.

== Personal life ==
In 1927, she had a short affair with writer F. Scott Fitzgerald who had moved with his wife to Hollywood in order to write a flapper comedy for United Artists. Moran became a temporary muse for the author, and he rewrote Rosemary Hoyt, one of the central characters in Tender is the Night (who had been a male in earlier drafts), to closely mirror her.

In 1935, she married Clarence M. Young, assistant secretary of commerce, temporarily retiring from her acting career. They had one son, Timothy, and remained together until Young's death in 1973.

== Death ==
Moran died at a nursing home in Sedona, Arizona, after suffering from cancer. She was cremated, and her ashes were scattered in the Red Rock country in Arizona.

== Selected filmography ==
- La Galerie des monstres (1924)
- Stella Dallas (1925)
- Feu Mathias Pascal (1925)
- Just Suppose (1926)
- The Road to Mandalay (1926)
- Padlocked (1926)
- Prince of Tempters (1926)
- God Gave Me Twenty Cents (1926)
- The Whirlwind of Youth (1927)
- The Music Master (1927)
- Publicity Madness (1927)
- Don't Marry (1928)
- Love Hungry (1928)
- Blindfold (1928)
- Words and Music (1929)
- Joy Street (1929)
- Making the Grade (1929)
- True Heaven (1929)
- A Song of Kentucky (1929)
- The Dancers (1930)
- Not Damaged (1930)
- Under Suspicion (1930)
- Transatlantic (1931)
- Men in Her Life (1931)
- The Spider (1931)
- West of Broadway (1931)
