= The Age of Desire =

1923 film by Frank Borzage

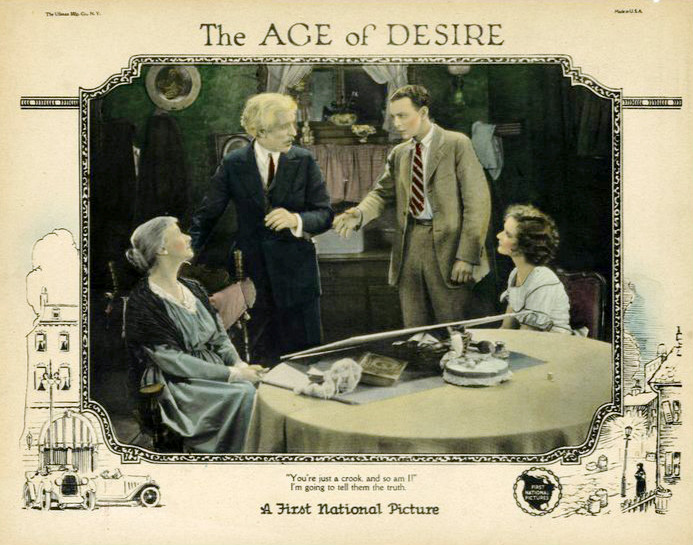
- Lobby card
- Directed by: Frank Borzage
- Written by: Mary O'Hara; Dixie Willson; Lenore J. Coffee (titles)
- Produced by: Arthur H. Jacobs
- Starring: Josef Swickard; William Collier Jr. Mary Philbin; Myrtle Stedman
- Cinematography: Chester A. Lyons
- Distributed by: Associated First National
- Release date: September 1923
- Running time: 6 reels
- Country: United States
- Language: Silent (English intertitles)

The Age of Desire is a 1923 American silent drama film directed by Frank Borzage and starring Josef Swickard, William Collier Jr., and Mary Philbin. It was distributed through Associated First National Pictures.

== Plot ==
As described in a film magazine review, Janet Loring deserts her young son Ranny when she marries the millionaire Malcolm Trask. Ranny becomes the tool of a criminal, but saves all of the money he gets so he can buy a home for the young woman that he loves. His mother misses him, and attempts to locate him by advertising for him. As a scheme, the crook sends Ranny in response to the advertisement, not knowing that he is really her son. Ranny takes money from his mother, but then becomes conscience stricken, and admits to her that he is an imposter. However, she convinces him that he belongs to her. Ranny promises to go straight, and Trask is happy to have a son. Ranny marries his sweetheart.

== Cast ==
- Josef Swickard as Marcio
- William Collier Jr. as Ranny (age 21)
- Frederick Truesdell as Malcolm Trask (credited as Frank Truesdell)
- Bruce Guerin as Ranny (age 3)
- Frankie Lee as Ranny (age 13)
- J. Farrell MacDonald as Dan Reagan
- Mary Jane Irving as Margy (age 10)
- Myrtle Stedman as Janet Loring
- Aggie Herring as Ann Reagan
- Mary Philbin as Margy (age 18)
- Edith Yorke as Gran'ma

== Preservation ==
With no prints of The Age of Desire located in any film archives, it is a lost film.
