= Dixie Willson =

American screenwriter (1890–1974)

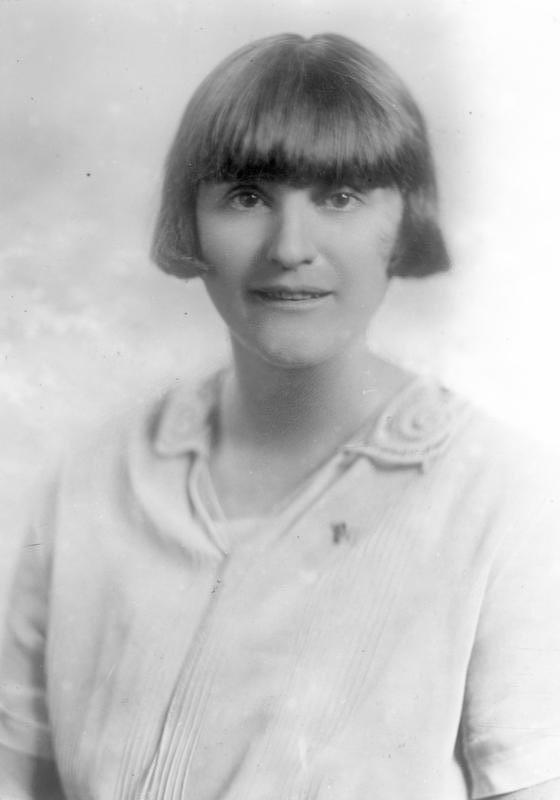
Dixie Willson (1930)

Dixie Lucile Reiniger Willson (30 July 1890 – 6 February 1974) was an American screenwriter, as well as an author of children's books, novels, and short stories.

== Life ==
Willson was born in Estherville, Iowa to John David Willson, a lawyer, and Rosalie Willson née Reiniger, a primary school teacher and piano tutor. In 1894 her parents moved to Mason City where her two brothers were born, John Cedric Willson and Robert Meredith Willson, who later came to prominence as the composer of the Broadway hit musical The Music Man.

== Work ==
Willson produced numerous children's books, as well as many short stories and poems. Her best-known children's book is titled Honey Bear and contains illustrations of Maginel Wright Barney, sister of Frank Lloyd Wright. The story, told in verse, is about a baby being taken from his bassinet and into the forest by a bear. Tom Wolfe cites the book as the one which first made him wish to be a writer.

In Where the World Folds Up at Night, Willson chronicled the daily operations of the Ringling Brothers and Barnum and Bailey Circus, with which she performed for a brief time. Several other circus-themed books, including Little Texas and Mystery in Spangles, owe much to her close friend Bird Millman, a high-wire artist to whom she dedicated Honey Bear.

The famous, uplifting poem titled "In Life's Garden" (frequently adapted on greeting cards as "Count Your Blessings") was written by Dixie Willson.

Because it became immensely popular as a birthday card verse, it is often misattributed to anonymous authors or public figures like Dixie Lee Crosby. The original, complete stanza reads:

Count your garden by the flowers,

Never by the leaves that fall—

Count your days by golden hours,

Don't remember clouds at all.

Count your nights by stars, not shadows,

Count your life by smiles—not tears—

And with joy through all your lifetime,

Count your age by friends—not years.

=== Books ===
- Pinky-Pup. P.F. Volland Co., Chicago 1922.
- Pinky Pup and The Empty Elephant. P.F. Volland Co., New York 1922.
- Honey Bear. Algonquin Publishing Co., New York 1923.
- The Empty Elephant. P.F. Volland Co., New York 1923.
- Clown Town. Doubleday, Page & Co, Garden City, New York 1924.
- A Circus ABC. Frederick A. Stokes Co., New York 1924.
- Little Texas: A Story of the Circus. D. Appleton & Co., New York 1925.
- Tuffy Good Luck. P.F. Volland Co., New York 1927.
- Games For Grown Ups. written with Harriet Eager Davis, Delineator Service, New York 1929.
- Five Minute Plays. Delineator Service, New York 1930.
- Once Upon A Monday. P.F. Volland Co., Joliet 1931.
- Where The World Folds Up at Night. D. Appleton & Co., New York 1932.
- Favorite Stories of Famous Children. Henry Holt & Co., New York 1938.
- Hostess of the Skyways. Dodd, Mead & Co, New York 1941.
- Hollywood Starlet. Dodd, Mead & Co., New York 1942.
- Mystery of the Scarlet Staircase. Dodd, Mead & Co., New York 1946.
- The Veiled Mystery. Dodd, Mead & Co., New York 1948.
- Three Buckaroos. John Martin's House, 1950.
- Way Out West: A Cowboy Story. P.F. Volland Co., 1950.
- Mystery in Spangles. Dodd, Mead & Co., New York 1950.

=== Screenplays and film adaptations ===
- 1923 The Age of Desire
- 1926 God Gave Me 20-Cents Co-written by Elizabeth Meehan and Jack Russell
- 1927 An Affair of the Follies (Here Y'Are, Brother) co-written by June Mathis and Carey Wilson, Al Rockett Productions
- 1928 Three-Ring Marriage (Help Yourself to Hay)
- 1932 Ebb Tide (God Gave Me 20 Cents)

=== Short stories (selection) ===
- Imogene Novré. All-Story Weekly, 16. March 1918
- Girl in the Dust. The Delineator, December 1921
- Man in You. McClure’s, January 1923
- Dust in the Doorvmy. McClure’s, February 1923
- For Graham Brady. The Delineator, March 1923
- Lodging-House. The Delineator, November 1923
- Once in Alabama. The Delineator, May 1924
- Kings and Things. Ladies Home Journal, June 1924
- Cross-Eyed Captain. Ladies Home Journal, November 1925
- Moon-Rose. The Delineator, December 1925
- Here Y’are Brother. Good Housekeeping, December 1925
- God Gave Me Twenty Cents. Cosmopolitan, July 1926
- Sunrise. The American Magazine, August 1926
- Quality. The Delineator, September 1926
- Help Yourself to Hay. Cosmopolitan, May 1927
- Meet the Duchess. Liberty, 4. August 1928
- From Here to Heaven. The Delineator, November 1928
- Two I Love. The American Magazine, November 1928
- Tell Me a Story About a Bear!. The Delineator, August 1929
- Stray Dog Who Wouldn’t Be Lost. The Delineator, October 1929
- Mr. Money. The American Magazine, September 1929
- Two Little Girls. The Delineator, September 1929
- Blue Whiskers. The American Magazine, November 1929
- Who Kissed Me?. Cosmopolitan, November 1929
- Jolly Good Boots. The Delineator, December 1929
- Miss Coney Island. The Delineator, February 1930
- Knock on Wood. The Delineator, March 1930
- Elephant I Know. The Delineator, June 1930
- Dream Machine. The Delineator, September 1930
- A Queen Goes Fishing, Photoplay, September 1930.
- Charity Begins at Home. Cosmopolitan, March 1932
- Tricks in Trades. McCall’s, October 1932
- Bunny Buttons. The Delineator, September 1932
- Ghost of Halfpenny Lane. The Delineator, November 1932
- Monkey Manners. The Delineator, May 1933
- Three Tradesmen Call on a King. The Delineator, December 1933
