= The Music Master (1927 film) =

1927 film by Allan Dwan

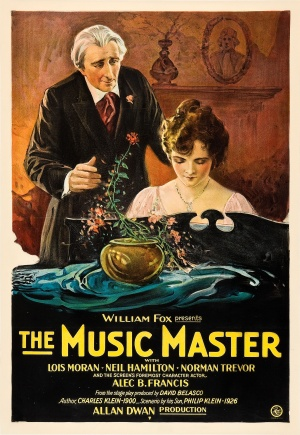
- Theatrical release poster
- Directed by: Allan Dwan
- Screenplay by: Philip Klein
- Based on: From the stage play produced by David Belasco
- Starring: Lois Moran; Neil Hamilton; Norman Trevor and the screen's foremost character actor Alec B. Francis
- Cinematography: William Miller; George Webber
- Production company: Fox Film Corporation
- Distributed by: Fox Film Corporation
- Release date: January 23, 1927
- Running time: 80 minutes
- Country: United States
- Language: English

The Music Master is a 1927 American silent drama film directed by Allan Dwan and written by Philip Klein, adapted from the play The Music Master by David Belasco. The film stars Alec B. Francis, Lois Moran, Neil Hamilton, Norman Trevor, Charles Lane and William T. Tilden. The film was released on January 23, 1927, by Fox Film Corporation.

== Cast ==
- Alec B. Francis as Anton von Barwig
- Lois Moran as Helene Stanton
- Neil Hamilton as Beverly Cruger
- Norman Trevor as Andrew Cruger
- Charles Lane as Richard Stanton
- William T. Tilden as Joles
- Helen Chandler as Jenny
- Marcia Harris as Miss Husted
- Kathleen Kerrigan as Mrs. Andrew Cruger
- Howard Cull as August Poons
- Armand Cortez as Pinac
- Leo Feodoroff as Fico
- Carrie Scott as Mrs. Mangeborn
- Dore Davidson as Pawnbroker
- Walter Catlett as Medicine Show Barker

== Preservation status ==
This film is now lost.

== See also ==
- 1937 Fox vault fire
