= The Unholy Three (1930 film) =

1930 American melodrama film

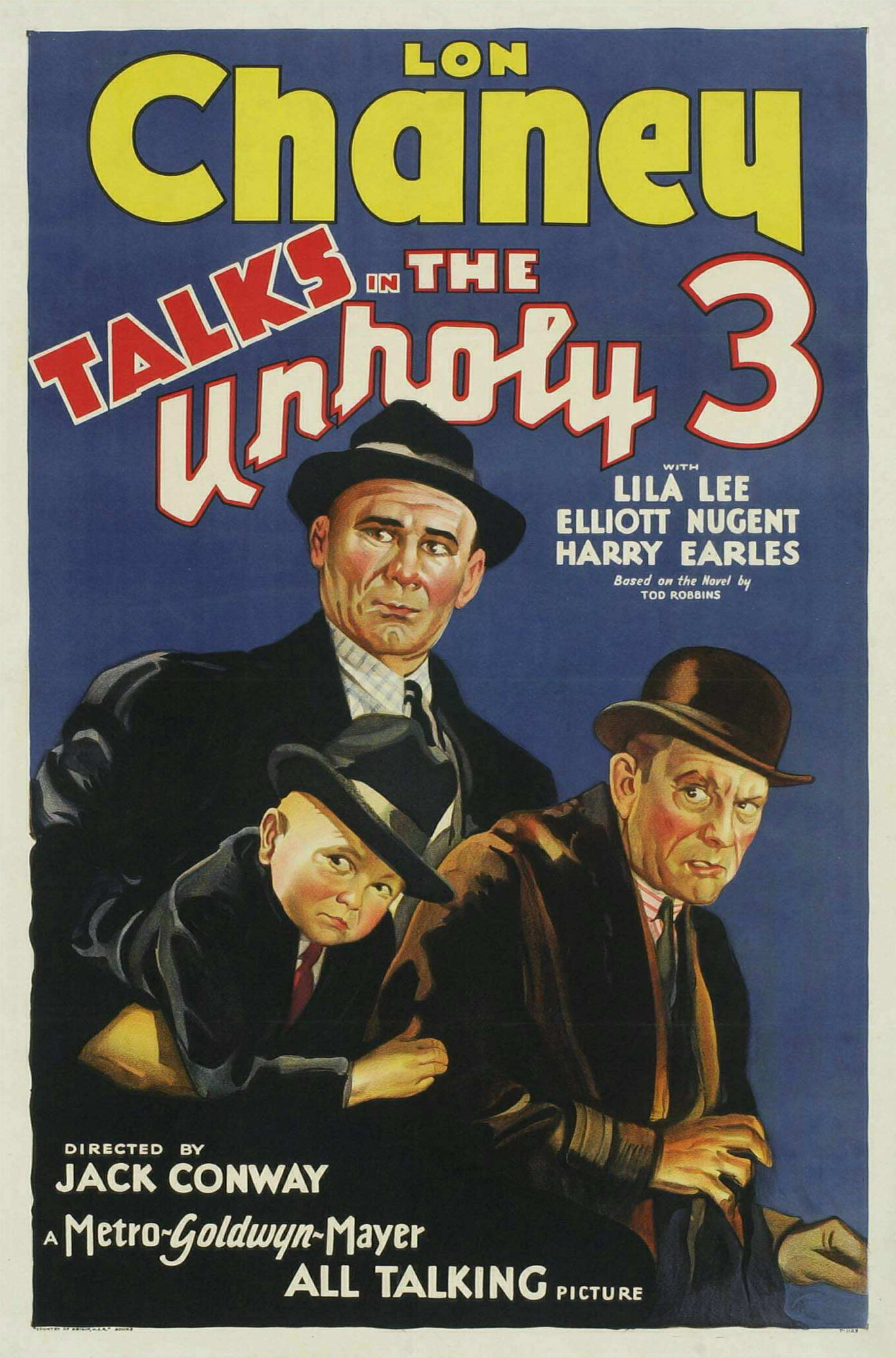
- The Unholy Three, 1930 remake, was the first talkie and last film of Lon Chaney, showing him, on the far right, of the theatrical film poster
- Directed by: Jack Conway
- Written by: J. C. Nugent; Elliott Nugent
- Based on: The Unholy Three; 1917 novel by Tod Robbins
- Produced by: Irving Thalberg
- Starring: Lon Chaney; Lila Lee; Elliott Nugent; Harry Earles
- Cinematography: Percy Hilburn
- Edited by: Frank Sullivan
- Music by: William Axt
- Production company: Metro-Goldwyn-Mayer
- Distributed by: Metro-Goldwyn-Mayer
- Release date: July 12, 1930
- Running time: 72 minutes
- Country: United States
- Language: English
- Box office: $988,000

The Unholy Three is a 1930 American pre-Code melodrama directed by Jack Conway and starring Lon Chaney. Its plot involves a crime spree. The film is a sound remake of the silent 1925 film of the same name, with both films based on the novel The Unholy Three, by Tod Robbins.

In both versions, the roles of Professor Echo and Tweedledee are played by Lon Chaney and Harry Earles respectively. This film is notable for the fact that it was Chaney's last film, as well as his only talkie. Chaney died from throat cancer one month after the film's release.

== Plot ==
The Unholy Three (1930)

A sideshow is closed by the police after Tweedledee, the embittered "Twenty Inch Man", kicks a young boy, starting a riot. Echo, the ventriloquist, proposes that Tweedledee, the strongman Hercules, and he leave and, as "The Unholy Three", use their talents to commit crimes. Echo also takes along his pickpocket girlfriend Rosie and his gorilla, whom Hercules fears.

Echo disguises himself as Mrs. O'Grady, a kindly old grandmother who runs a pet shop. Tweedledee pretends to be her baby grandson, and Hercules her son-in-law. They use the information they gain from their wealthier patrons to rob them. Echo is the leader and brains behind the outfit, but his bossy ways leave the other two resentful. Meanwhile, the shop's clerk, Hector McDonald, falls in love with Rosie.

The gang is ready to pull off a theft on Christmas Eve. When Echo decides to postpone it, Tweedledee and Hercules go ahead without him. Afterwards, Tweedledee gleefully recounts how they not only robbed but also killed the wealthy Mr. Arlington, despite his pleas for mercy. Worried about the police, they decide to frame Hector by planting a stolen necklace in his closet.

That same night, Hector asks Rosie to marry him. Ashamed of her past, she pretends she was only leading him on for a laugh. After he leaves, she starts crying; he returns, sees that she really does love him, and they become engaged.

However, Hector is arrested for murder. Still frightened, the Unholy Trio hide out in an isolated cabin in the country, forcibly taking Rosie with them. Rosie pleads with Echo to exonerate Hector somehow in exchange for her returning to him. Tweedledee tries to persuade Hercules to shoot them both, but the strongman refuses.

Echo, as "Grandma" O'Grady, shows up at the trial and tries to provide an alibi, but slips up and his disguise is discovered. He makes a full confession and receives a sentence of one to five years. Back at the cabin, Tweedledee overhears Hercules offering Rosie a chance to run away with him (and the loot), so he lets loose the gorilla; Hercules murders Tweedledee before he himself is killed by the ape. Rosie escapes.

As Echo is being taken to prison, Rosie promises to wait for him, honoring their agreement. Realizing she loves Hector, he generously tells her not to.

== Cast ==
- Lon Chaney as Professor Echo / Mrs O'Grady
- Lila Lee as Rosie O'Grady
- Elliott Nugent as Hector McDonald
- Harry Earles as Midget / Tweedle Dee
- John Miljan as Prosecuting Attorney
- Ivan Linow as Hercules
- Clarence Burton as Detective Regan
- Crauford Kent as Defense Attorney
- Sidney Bracey as Mr. Arlington's butler
- Trixie Friganza as Lady Customer (uncredited)
- Joseph W. Girard as Judge (uncredited)
- Armand Kaliz as Jeweler (uncredited)
- Charles Gemora as Gorilla (uncredited)

== Reception ==
Contemporary reviews were positive, particularly praising Lon Chaney's performance. Kinema Guide called Lon Chaney's performance "remarkable," and the film "extremely melodramatic and packed with genuine thrills," with a "weird and dramatic atmosphere." Talking Screen similarly praised Chaney, claiming, "Just as Lon Chaney was outstanding as a man of many faces in the silents, so he will be outstanding as a man of many voices as well as faces in the talkies." The review went on to call the film, "one of the outstanding things of the year." The review in Photoplay similarly raved about Chaney, noting "Lon Chaney's uses five voices...but the deeply satisfying thing through it all is his own voice."

Film critic Leonard Maltin awarded the film two and a half out of four stars, praising Chaney's performance while criticizing the performances by the rest of the cast.
