= The Doll Family =

Quartet of sibling entertainers

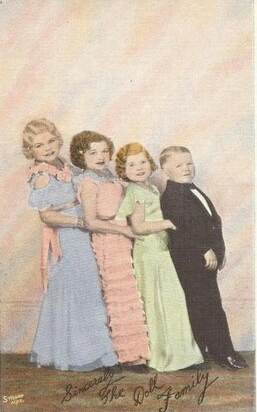
- The Doll Family (from left) Daisy, Gracie, Tiny and Harry
- Born: Stolpen, Kingdom of Saxony, Germany
- Died: Sarasota, Florida, United States
- Other names: The Dancing Dolls, The Earls Family
- Occupations: Film actors, sideshow performers
- Known for: The Munchkins in The Wizard of Oz

The Doll Family (Note: Also billed as The Dancing Dolls and the Earles Family) was an American quartet of sibling entertainers with dwarfism from Stolpen, Germany. They were popular performers in circuses and sideshows in the United States from the mid-1910s until their retirement in 1958. The family members—Gracie, Harry, Daisy and Tiny—also appeared briefly in films; they were best known as members of The Munchkins in the 1939 MGM film The Wizard of Oz.

Harry and Daisy, billed as Harry Earles and Daisy Earles respectively, both starred in the cult classic film Freaks; Tiny also made a brief appearance in the film.

== Members ==
Name	Also known as	Birth name	Birth date	Death date
Harry Earles	Harry Doll	Kurt Fritz Schneider	April 3, 1902	May 4, 1985 (aged 83)
Daisy Earles	Daisy Doll	Hilda Emma Schneider	April 29, 1907	March 15, 1980 (aged 72)
Daisy Earles	Midget Mae West	Hilda Emma Schneider	April 29, 1907	March 15, 1980 (aged 72)
Gracie Doll	Gracie Earles	Frieda A. Schneider	March 12, 1899	November 8, 1970 (aged 71)
Tiny Doll	Tiny Earles	Elly Annie Schneider	July 23, 1914	September 6, 2004 (aged 90)

== History ==
=== Early years ===
The Doll family were four of seven children born to Amelia Emma Preusche and Gustav Schneider in Stolpen, Germany. They were encouraged by their father to work in the entertainment field, taking advantage of their "hypopituitary" status.

Kurt and Frieda were the first to migrate to California in 1916, after they met Bert W. Earles and his wife, who became their agents. The Earles had toured with the Dancing Dolls family prior to becoming actors under new names. Kurt and Frieda changed their names to Harry and Grace to act in films, and they adopted the surname Earles of their manager. Their first dance appearance was for the Buffalo Bill Show in the roles as "Hansel and Gretel", for which they were hailed as the "Smallest Dancing Couple in the World". Hilda, who later came to be known as Daisy Earles, joined her brother and sister in California in the early 1920s. Another sister, Elly, joined them in 1926; she was called "Tiny" because of her appearance. All four siblings, who had earlier taken the surname Earles, changed it to "Doll" after the death of their manager, Earles.

At this time, the Dolls began touring with Ringling Brothers and Barnum and Bailey Circus, where they sang, danced and rode horses and wagons for the next 30 years. Daisy soon earned the nickname "Midget Mae West" and was often billed as such.

Franz Taibosh, a South African-born Griqua performer with the circus, had a crush on Daisy Earles, but she was not interested. She was already married to the family's chauffeur and bodyguard.

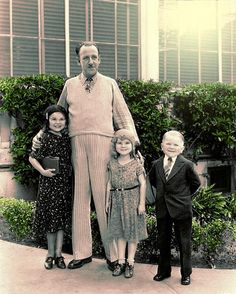
The Doll Family with director Tod Browning

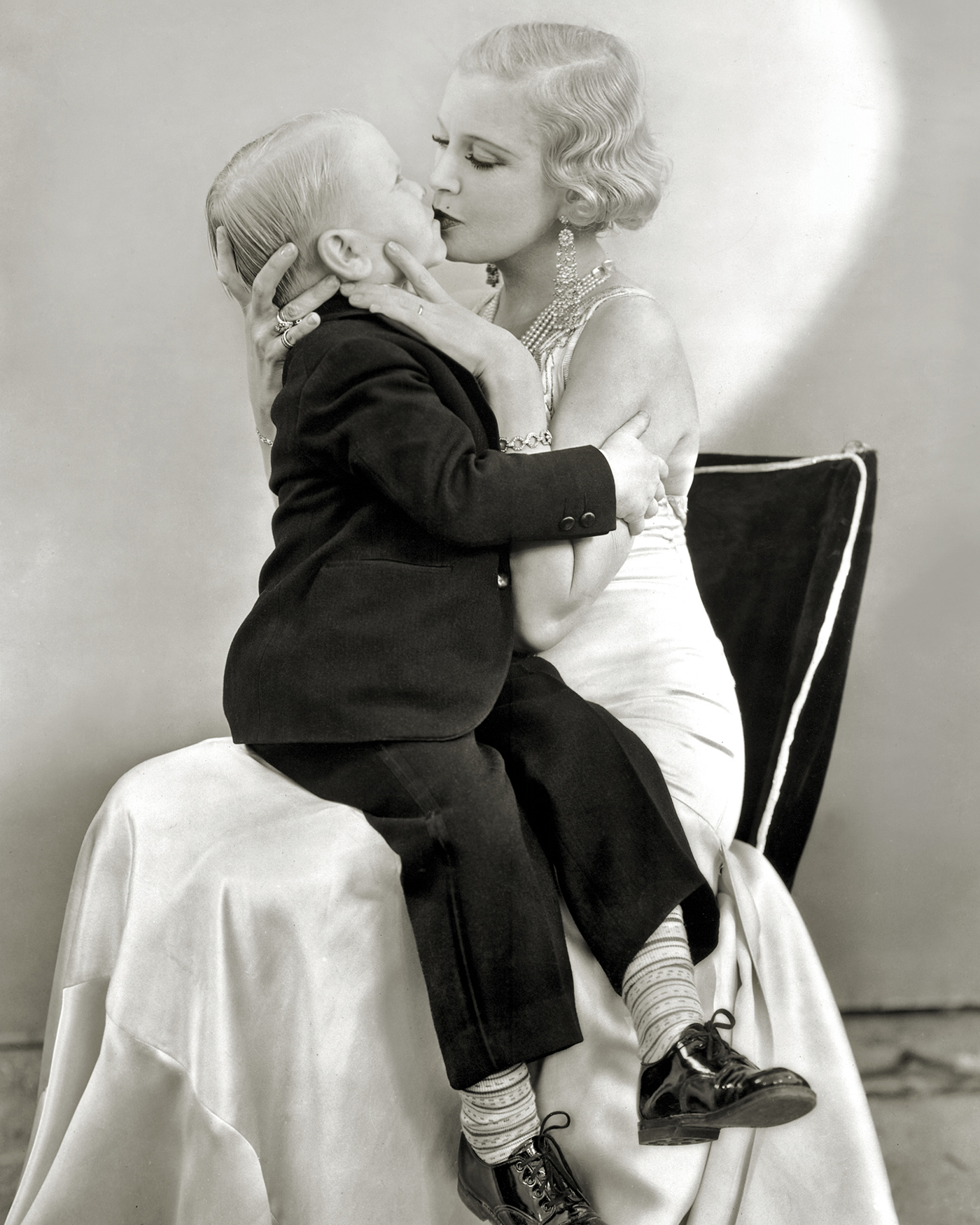
Harry Earles with Olga Baclanova in film Freaks

=== Film roles ===
The Doll family had a brief tenure in film, Harry was the first to begin a film career, and also had the most prolific career in the genre. His first film was Tod Browning's Lon Chaney vehicle The Unholy Three (1925) as the ruthless Tweedledee. He reprised the role for the 1930 sound remake, again with Chaney, but this time directed by Jack Conway. The family also began appearing in films together, almost always as circus performers, and acted in some comedies with Laurel and Hardy. Harry and Daisy were cast in major roles in Metro-Goldwyn-Mayer's 1932 film Freaks, while Tiny had a small part.

However, the 1932 film was considered horrifying, and was shown in the U.S. with many cuts, banned in England, and in Canada was called "brutal and grotesque". In fact, Harry himself brought to Browning's attention the Tod Robbins story "Spurs" on which elements of the film were based.

In 1928, Daisy Earles had appeared in the 1928 film Three-Ring Marriage. All four siblings performed as "Munchkins" in a song and dance sequence along the Yellow Brick Road in The Wizard of Oz (1939). Harry played a minor featured part as a member of the Lollipop Guild, who welcome Dorothy upon her arrival in Oz. They were not credited individually in the film, but as part of the larger group of "The Singer Midgets", despite having been generally well known in their own careers as "The Doll Family".

The family's opportunities as film actors had always been limited, by both their size and their German accents, and they stopped appearing in films, although Daisy played a small part in The Greatest Show on Earth in 1952. They returned to the traveling sideshows. The Dolls toured with the Christiani Circus after the Ringling Circus was sold in 1956. They retired two years later.

=== Personal lives and later years ===
The Doll family were close-knit, and always lived, ate and worked alongside one another, with the exception of Daisy's brief marriage in 1942, to an average-sized man, which ended in divorce less than a year later.

Their decades with the circus had provided the siblings with a good living, and they bought a house in Sarasota, Florida, in which all four lived. The house, which was often featured in magazines, was furnished with custom-built reduced-size furniture. On the grounds of the house was a "Doll's House", which the family opened to the public. Each of the four remained living in the house until their deaths. Tiny was the last survivor; she died in 2004 after a long illness and many years living alone, after Harry's death in 1985.

== Bibliography ==
- Eagan, Daniel (2010). America's Film Legacy: The Authoritative Guide to the Landmark Movies in the National Film Registry. A&C Black. ISBN 978-0-8264-2977-3.
- Kérchy, Anna; Zittlau, Andrea (2013). Exploring the Cultural History of Continental European Freak Shows and 'Enfreakment'. Cambridge Scholars Publishing. ISBN 978-1-4438-4642-4.
- Parsons, Neil; Smith, Alexander McCall (2010). Clicko: The Wild Dancing Bushman. University of Chicago Press. ISBN 978-0-226-64742-5.
- Paszylk, Barthomiej (2009). The Pleasure and Pain of Cult Horror Films: An Historical Survey. McFarland. ISBN 978-0-7864-5327-6.
- Senn, Bryan (2006). Golden Horrors: An Illustrated Critical Filmography of Terror Cinema, 1931–1939. McFarland. ISBN 978-0-7864-2724-6.
