= Ebb Tide (1932 film) =

1932 film

- Contemporary advertisement
- Directed by: Arthur Rosson
- Written by: Reginald Denham; Basil Mason
- Based on: "God Gave Me Twenty Cents'" by Dixie Willson
- Produced by: Walter Morosco
- Starring: Dorothy Bouchier; Joan Barry; George Barraud
- Cinematography: Philip Tannura
- Production company: Paramount British Pictures
- Distributed by: Paramount British Pictures
- Release date: 16 February 1932
- Running time: 74 minutes
- Country: United Kingdom
- Language: English

Ebb Tide is a 1932 British drama film directed by Arthur Rosson and starring Dorothy Bouchier, Joan Barry, George Barraud, and Merle Oberon. It was written by Reginald Denham and Basil Mason based on the short story "God Gave Me Twenty Cents" by Dixie Willson, which had previously been made into a 1926 American silent film of the same title. It was shot at Elstree Studios and on location in London with sets were designed by the art director Holmes Paul. It was produced and distributed by the British branch of Paramount Pictures as a quota quickie.

== Preservation status ==
The British Film Institute National Archive holds a collection of ephemera and stills but no film or video materials.

== Plot ==
A sailor falls in love with a woman he meets at the dockside, but is deeply conflicted because his former lover is in prison.

== Cast ==
- Dorothy Bouchier as Cassie
- Joan Barry as Mary
- George Barraud as Steve
- Vanda Gréville as Millie
- Alexander Field as Barney
- Annie Esmond as Landlady
- Merle Oberon as girl
- Leonard Shepherd as Tom James

== Reception ==
Film Weekly wrote: "EbbTide rarely gets to grips with reality. When it does, thanks to occasional moments of effective acting, it is worth watching: but generally the direction is so casual and the story so leisurely that one does not really care what happens to the characters."

Kine Weekly wrote: "Unpretentious dockside drama with good atmosphere, but slight story values. The Cockney humour dominates the drama, and the balance is sufficiently well preserved to make the picture an average supporting attraction for the majority of halls. ... The producer, Reginald Denham, has succeeded in creating a convincing and colourful Thames-side atmosphere, but he has failed to draw strong and arresting drama from the slight theme."

The Daily Film Renter wrote: "Excellent shots of Pool of London and good 'Cockney' performance from Alexander Field only attractive features of too lengthy Elstree production. Direction and continuity patchy; story unfolded so slowly that ensuing development can be seen early on. Leading parts badly cast – protagonists being too refined for characters they have to interpret."
