= The Unholy Three (1925 film) =

1925 American silent film

The Unholy Three (1925)
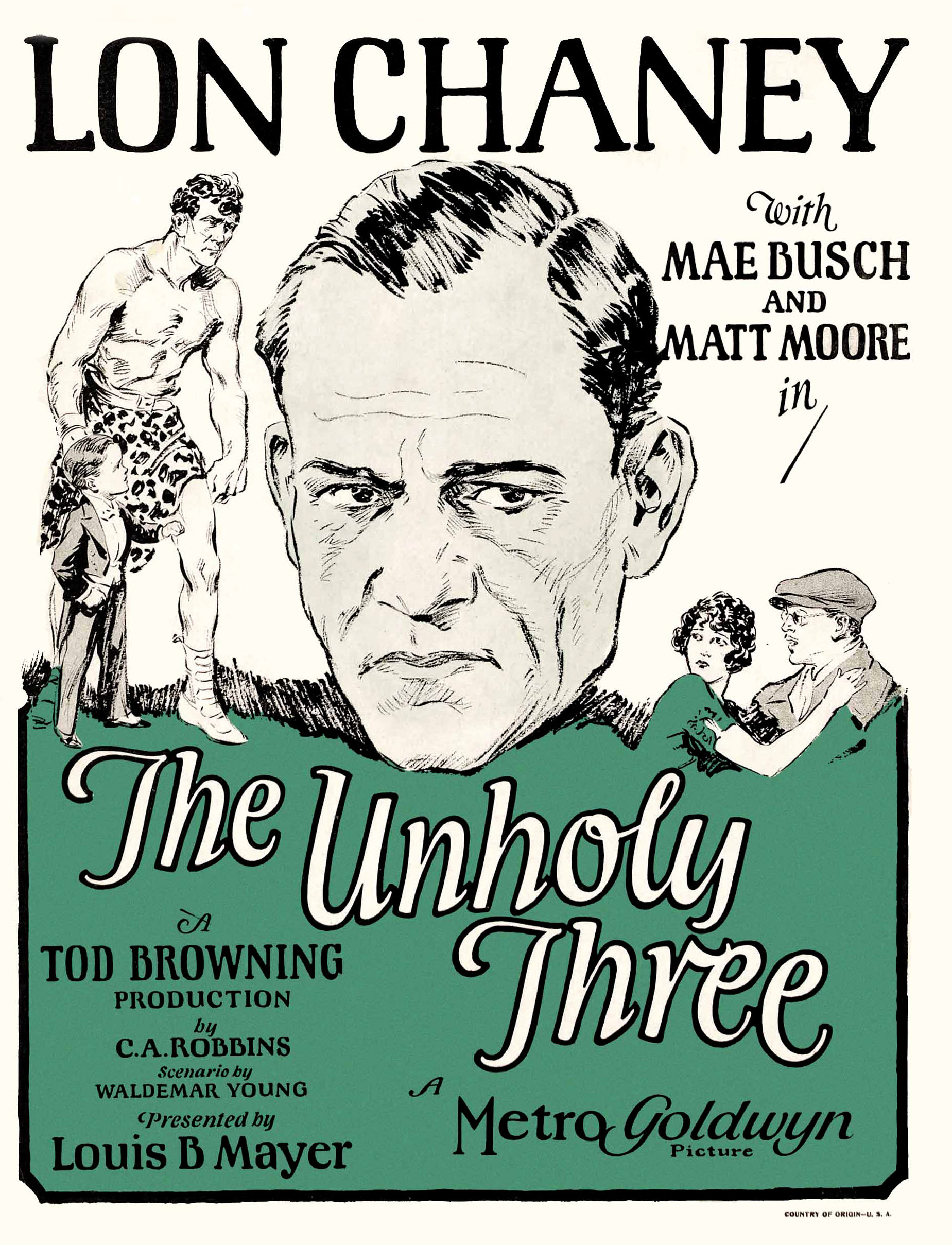
- 1925 The Unholy Three, theatrical release poster
- Directed by: Tod Browning
- Written by: Waldemar Young (scenario)
- Based on: The Unholy Three; 1917 novel by Tod Robbins
- Produced by: Louis B. Mayer; Irving Thalberg (uncredited)
- Starring: Lon Chaney; Victor McLaglen; Harry Earles; Mae Busch; Matt Moore; Matthew Betz
- Cinematography: David Kesson
- Edited by: Daniel Gray; Irving Thalberg (uncredited)
- Production company: Metro-Goldwyn-Mayer
- Distributed by: Metro-Goldwyn Distributing Corporation (Note: Loews was the parent company of MGM.)
- Release dates: May 30, 1925 (premiere): August 16, 1925; (release)
- Running time: 86 minutes
- Country: United States
- Language: Silent (English intertitles)

The Unholy Three is a 1925 American silent crime melodrama film involving a trio of circus conmen, directed by Tod Browning and starring Lon Chaney. The supporting cast features Mae Busch, Matt Moore, Victor McLaglen, and Harry Earles. The Unholy Three marks the establishment of the notable artistic alliance between director Browning and actor Chaney that would deliver eight films to M-G-M studios during the late silent film era.

Principal photography went from December 1924 through January 20, 1925. The film had a premiere on May 30, 1925 in San Francisco. It went into release in New York at the Capitol Theatre on August 16, 1925. The film's budget was $114,000, and the worldwide box office gross was $704,000. Stills exist showing Chaney's two makeups in the film, his ventiloquist act, as well as a group shot of the Unholy Three plotting together.

The film was remade in 1930 as a talkie directed by Jack Conway. Chaney and Earles repeated their performances as Professor Echo and Tweedledee. Chaney died shortly after filming the 1930 remake, the only film to feature the actor's voice.

== Plot ==
The Unholy Three (1925)

Three performers leave a sideshow after Tweedledee, a midget performer, assaults a young heckler and sparks a melee. The three join together in an "unholy" plan to become wealthy. Professor Echo, the ventriloquist, assumes the role of Mrs. O'Grady, a kindly old grandmother, who runs a pet shop, while Tweedledee plays her grandchild. Hercules, the strongman, works in the shop along with the unsuspecting Hector McDonald. Echo's girlfriend, pickpocket Rosie O'Grady, pretends to be his granddaughter.

Using what they learn from delivering pets, the trio later commit burglaries, with their wealthy buyers as victims. On Christmas Eve, John Arlington telephones to complain that the "talking" parrot (aided by Echo's ventriloquism) he bought will not speak. When "Granny" O'Grady visits Mr. Arlington to coax the bird into performing, "she" takes along grandson "Little Willie" in a baby carriage (to case the place). While there, they learn that a valuable ruby necklace is in the house. They decide to steal it that night. As Echo is too busy, Hercules and Tweedledee grow impatient and decide to go ahead without him.

The next day, Echo is furious to read in the newspaper that Mr. Arlington was killed (by Hercules) and his three-year-old daughter badly injured in the robbery (choked into unconsciousness by Tweedledee, although the violence in the robbery sequence was edited out of the final print). Hercules shows no remorse whatsoever, relating how Arlington pleaded for his life. When a police investigator shows up at the shop, the trio become fearful and decide to frame Hector, hiding the stolen jewelry in his room.

Meanwhile, Hector proposes to Rosie. She turns him down, but he overhears her crying after he leaves. He goes back into her room and, to his joy, she confesses she loves him but is ashamed of her shady past. When the police arrest him, Rosie tells the trio that she will testify in his defense, forcing them to abduct her and they all flee to a mountain cabin. Echo takes along his large pet ape, who terrifies Hercules.

In the spring, Hector is brought to trial. Rosie pleads with Echo to save Hector, promising to stay with him if he does. After Echo leaves for the city, Tweedledee overhears Hercules asking Rosie to run away with him and the loot. Tweedledee releases the ape from his cage. Hercules strangles Tweedledee to death just before the ape kills him.

At the trial, Echo agonizes over what to do, but finally rushes forward and confesses all. Both he and Hector are set free. When Rosie goes to Echo to keep her promise of marrying him, he lies and says he was only kidding. He tells her to go to Hector. Echo returns to the sideshow, and the last scene shows him on stage, giving his spiel to the customers: "That's all there is to life, friends, ... a little laughter ... a little tear."

== Cast ==
- Lon Chaney Dual role as Professor Echo and Mrs. O'Grady
- Mae Busch as Rosie O'Grady
- Matt Moore as Hector McDonald
- Victor McLaglen as Hercules, the "son-in-law"
- Harry Earles as Tweedledee, the "baby"
- Matthew Betz as Detective Regan
- Edward Connelly as the Judge
- William Humphrey as Defense Attorney
- E. Alyn Warren as Prosecuting Attorney
- John Merkyl as the jeweler
- Percy Williams as the butler
- Charles Wellesley as John Arlington
- Walter Perry as Carnival announcer
- Alice Julian as the Fat Lady
- Lou Morrison as Police Commissioner
- Walter P. Cole as the Human Skeleton
- Peter Kortos and Delmo Fritz as the Sword Swallowers
- Mickey McBan as the boy watching Hercules' act
- Violet Crane as the Arlington baby (cut from print)
- Vera Vance as Carnival dancer
- John Millerta as the Wild Man
- Carrie Daumery as Pet Shop Customer
- Margie and Mary Angus as the Twins

== Production ==
In 1924, Universal's vice-president Irving Thalberg departed to join Metro-Goldwyn-Mayer studios as production manager. Director Tod Browning followed him to M-G-M after producing a number of unimpressive independent films.

At M-G-M he proposed adapting author Tod Robbins’ The Unholy Three and Thalberg accommodated Browning by purchasing the rights and enlisting Lon Chaney to play the lead; Chaney may have requested that Browning direct, having worked with him effectively in 1921 on Universal’s Outside the Law starring Priscilla Dean.

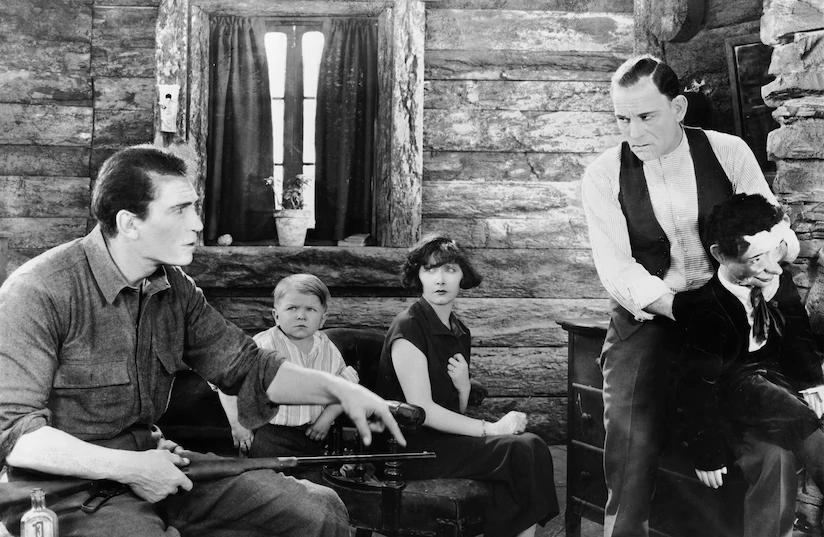
The Unholy Three (1925 film) L to R: Victor McLaglen, Harry Earles, Mae Busch, Lon Chaney

With The Unholy Three, Thalberg, Browning and Chaney established a creative collaboration that was profitable with seven more films produced at M-G-M, marking the zenith of both Browning’s and Chaney’s careers.

Browning arrived at M-G-M well-versed in the techniques of "trick photography". The "ape" that dispatches the strongman Hector (Victor McLaglen) was actually a three-foot-tall chimpanzee who was made to appear gigantic with camera trickery and perspective shots. When Echo removes the ape from his cage, the shot shows Echo (with his back turned to the camera) unlocking the cage and walking the ape to the truck. The ape appears to be roughly the same size as Echo. This effect was achieved by having Harry Earles (who played "Tweedledee" in the film) play Echo for these brief shots, and then cutting to Chaney, making it seem as though the ape is gigantic. (In the 1930 remake, the ape was played by Charles Gemora.)

== Critical comments ==
The Unholy Three enjoyed tremendous success, adding luster to Chaney's reputation as "The Man of a Thousand Faces" and revealing Browning as a remarkable film stylist. The film was named as one of The New York Times 10 Best Films of 1925.

On August 15, 1925, The Billboard published a list of five short reviews for the movie. This featured such critics as Mordaunt Hall (Times), George Gerhard (Evening World), Richard Watts Jr. (Herald-Tribune), and W.R. (World).

The movie was such a success upon its debut that at its release at the New York Capitol Theater, it maintained a strong audience attendance for at least two weeks. Major Edward Bowes, who was the managing director at the time, took steps to ensure everyone who did not get to see the movie the first week of its viewing would get to by extending the movie's stay. An article written about this event noted the movie as "acclaimed as the best crook drama on the screen and one of the most entertaining motion pictures ever made", which speaks, along with its apparent popularity, for the movie's quality.

Sherwood of Life magazine praised the movie for its photography and providing a more psychological horror film rather than relying on movie effects to scare its audience. Noted by Sherwood is how the film was shot, with great attention given to scenes as individual pieces rather than as parts of one greater project, causing continuity errors. This is explained by the writer as an acceptable outcome considering the overall quality. Sherwood concludes by declaring The Unholy Three to be "the best picture of its kind since The Miracle Man."

== Release ==
The Unholy Three was released for the first time on DVD by Warner Bros. Digital Distribution on October 26, 2010. The company would later re-release the film as a part of its 6-disc Lon Chaney: The Warner Archive Classics Collection on November 22, 2011, and on June 23, 2015.

On Rotten Tomatoes, the film holds an approval rating of 83% based on 6 reviews, with a weighted average rating of 6.8/10. Author and film critic Leonard Maltin gave the film two and a half out of four stars. Although Maltin noted that the film contained aspects that were less satisfactory, he commended its strong basic idea and Chaney's performance.

== Themes ==
As is common in a Tod Browning film, circus life and unusual bodies play a central role in this movie along with great use of trompe-l'œil optical illusion. Trompe-l'œil is exercised and played with as the illusion of Professor Echo as "Mrs. O'Grady" and Tweedledee as "Little Willie". The main plot of the movie revolves around the characters' abilities to pass themselves off convincingly as something they are not, an illusion the movie peels back and reasserts for both the other characters and for the audience themselves. Contrary to the usual use of this effect, Browning makes it a point to disillusion the audience and display the workings of the illusion to create a different sort of viewing stimulation.

In most Browning films, his opinion of the deformed and different becomes evident. The Unholy Three's plot plays directly with another of Browning's favorite topics, dealing with identity, doubles, dual roles, and deformity. This film is unique in that the character Tweedledee is the only one of this group of that is played by a deformed character and is malicious in nature. (In the original novel, Tweedledee was the "brains" of the gang, not Echo.)

== Bibliography ==
- Blyn, Robin. 2006. "Between Silence and Sound: Ventriloquism and the Advent of the Voice in The Unholy Three in The Films of Tod Browning", in The Films of Tod Browning, ed. Bernd Herzogenrath, 2006 Black Dog Publishing. London. pp. 117–127 ISBN 1-904772-51-X
- Eaker, Alfred. 2016. Tod Browning Retrospective TOD BROWNING: DIRECTOR RETROSPECTIVE Retrieved 26 February 2021.
- Herzogenrath, Bernd. 2006. The Films of Tod Browning. Black Dog Publishing. London. ISBN 1-904772-51-X
- Sobchack, Vivian. 2006. "The Films of Tod Browning: An Overview Long Past in The Films of Tod Browning" in The Films of Tod Browning, editor Bernd Herzogenrath, 2006 Black Dog Publishing. London. pp. 21–39. ISBN 1-904772-51-X
- Rosenthal, Stuart. 1975. Tod Browning: The Hollywood Professionals, Volume 4. The Tantivy Press. ISBN 0-498-01665-X
