= Laugh, Clown, Laugh =

1928 film

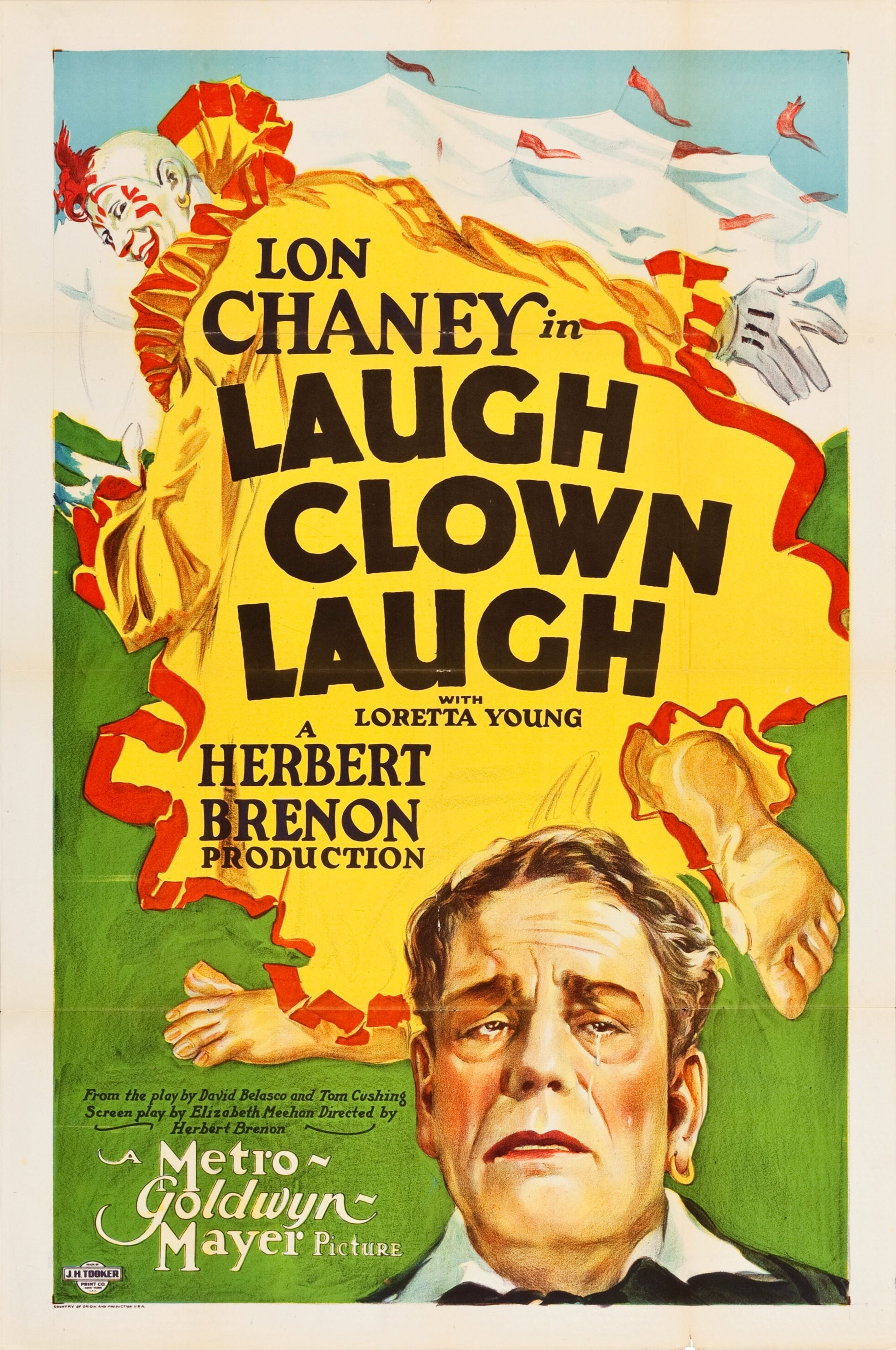
- Theatrical release poster
- Directed by: Herbert Brenon; Ray Lissner (assistant director)
- Written by: Elizabeth Meehan (screenplay); Joseph Farnham (titles)
- Based on: Laugh, Clown, Laugh; 1923 play by David Belasco and Tom Cushing (play) Ridi, Pagliaccio by Fausto Maria Martini (play)
- Produced by: Irving Thalberg
- Starring: Lon Chaney; Loretta Young
- Cinematography: James Wong Howe
- Edited by: Marie Halvey
- Music by: Theme "Laugh, Clown, Laugh"; Ted Fio Rito (music); Lewis and Young (lyrics)
- Production company: Metro-Goldwyn-Mayer
- Distributed by: Metro-Goldwyn-Mayer
- Release date: April 14, 1928
- Running time: 73 minutes (8 reels)
- Country: United States
- Languages: Silent Version; Sound Version (Synchronized) (English Intertitles)

Laugh, Clown, Laugh is a 1928 American silent drama film starring Lon Chaney and Loretta Young (her film debut). The film was directed by Herbert Brenon and produced by Irving G. Thalberg for MGM Pictures. A sound version of this film was released in the second half of 1928 and featured a synchronized musical score with sound effects. The film was written by Elizabeth Meehan, based on the 1923 Broadway stage production Laugh, Clown, Laugh by David Belasco and Tom Cushing, which in turn was based on the 1919 play Ridi, Pagliaccio by Fausto Maria Martini.

Stills exist which show Chaney in his clown make-up. The sets were designed by Cedric Gibbons. The film was in production from December 19, 1927, to February 2, 1928, and cost $293,000 to make. The worldwide box office gross was $1,102,000.

Laugh, Clown, Laugh is readily available today on DVD. The existing print, however, is not 100% complete; it is missing reel #4, but the missing footage does not severely impact the story.

An alternate happy ending—wherein Tito survives his fall, Simonetta marries Luigi, and they all remain close friends—was shot at the studio's insistence in case some studios preferred that ending, but the footage no longer exists.

== Plot ==
Laugh, Clown, Laugh (full film)

Tito, a traveling circus clown, finds an abandoned child. He adopts her and raises her as his daughter, naming her Simonetta after his brother Simon. One day the now-teenaged Simonetta encounters Count Luigi Ravelli, a wealthy man who falls madly in love with her. However, Simonetta rejects him when she discovers he has a girlfriend. She returns to the circus and Tito suddenly realizes she is no longer a child. Tito further realizes he is attracted to Simonetta, but knows his feelings are improper because he raised her as his daughter.

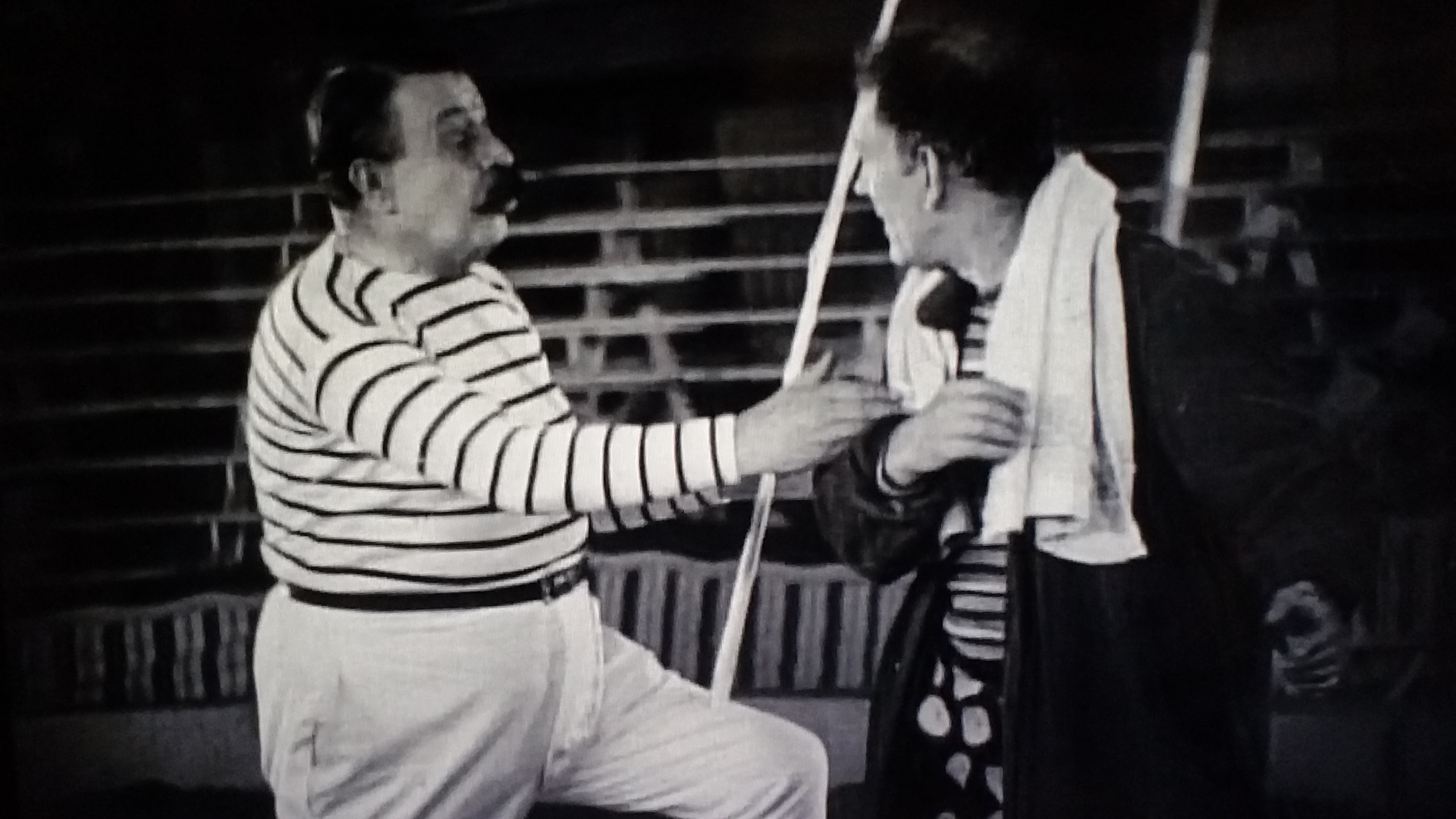
Leo Feodoroff advises Lon Chaney in Laugh Clown Laugh.

Luigi begins having fits of uncontrollable laughter because Simonetta has rejected him. Tito falls into melancholia because of his conflicted interests about Simonetta. They both see the same doctor about their conditions and meet each other there for the first time. Luigi and Tito share their respective troubles and believe they can help each other, not knowing they are in love with the same woman. Nonetheless, the three eventually develop a strong friendship until Luigi asks Simonetta to marry him. Simonetta eventually accepts Luigi's proposal, which throws Tito into an even deeper melancholy.

Before she marries Luigi, Simonetta learns of Tito's affections for her. She tells Tito she loved him before she loved Luigi, then goes to break her engagement. Meanwhile, Tito and his brother Simon begin rehearsing new material for their "Flik and Flok" act. Tito believes Simonetta pities rather than loves him; he also knows that, as her adopted father, it would be immoral to have her become his wife. Driven insane by his internal conflict, he decides to practice his new routine from the act without protection. Despite his brother's protests, he continues with the stunt and falls from the highwire. Tito dies from his fall, freeing Simonetta to marry Luigi.

== Cast ==
- Lon Chaney as Tito / Flik
- Loretta Young as Simonetta
- Nils Asther as Count Luigi Ravelli
- Bernard Siegel as Simon
- Cissy Fitzgerald as Giacinta
- Gwen Lee as Lucretia
- Leo Feodoroff
- Emmett King as the Doctor
- Julie DeValora as the Nurse
- Helena Dime as Woman at Party
- Frankie Genardi as Little Boy at Tito's Death
- Mickey McBan as 2nd Little Boy
- Lilliana Genardi as Little Girl
- Carl M. Leviness as Party Guest

== Production ==
The film is based on the 1923 Broadway stage production Laugh, Clown, Laugh which starred Lionel Barrymore as Tito, and his second wife Irene Fenwick in the role of Simonetta. The play by David Belasco and Tom Cushing, which in turn was based on a 1919 Italian stage play Ridi, Pagliaccio by Fausto Maria Martini, ran at the Belasco Theatre from November 28, 1923, to March 1924, for a total of 133 performances. The production also featured Lucille Kahn in a supporting role. These plays were all based on the 1891 opera I Pagliacci (The Clowns), by Ruggero Leoncavallo, the principal aria of which has the lyrics, "Ridi, Pagliaccio!" (Laugh, Clown!).

MGM was thinking of offering Chaney this film in 1925 but delayed production for several years, because Chaney had already appeared as a clown in the 1924 film He Who Gets Slapped and due to speculation that Lionel Barrymore might wish to reprise his role from the stage production. Instead, MGM would pair Barrymore with Chaney in West of Zanzibar.

=== Cast ===
As a trouping comic stage actor in his youth, Chaney would have been acquainted with clown performers. In preparation for this film and He Who Gets Slapped, Chaney also studied the clown makeup of circus performers and 19th-century clown stage actors like Joseph Grimaldi and George L. Fox, the latter of Humpty Dumpty fame. The film was said to have been Chaney's favorite of all his roles.

This film was Loretta Young's first major movie role, at the age of fourteen. In interviews near the end of her life, she expressed her gratitude toward Chaney for his kindness and guidance, and for protecting her from director Brenon's sometimes harsh treatment.

=== Music ===
The theme song "Laugh, Clown, Laugh" was composed by Ted Fio Rito while its lyrics having written by Lewis and Young and was featured in the sound version of the film which was released in the latter half of 1928. It became a hit record. Chaney's set musicians played the song at his 1930 funeral.

== Reception ==
=== Critical reception ===
Author and film critic Leonard Maltin awarded the film three out of a possible four stars, calling it "the perfect example of Chaney's unmatched talent for turning tearjerking melodrama into heartbreaking tragedy."

Historian Jon C. Mirsalis opined "Laugh, Clown, Laugh is certainly one of the loveliest of Chaney's films. The film was directed by Herbert Brenon, and was stunningly photographed by James Wong Howe, probably the finest cinematographer to work on a Chaney picture. Combined with a radiant 14-year old Loretta Young, and a higher than average budget, the end result is a beautiful film that holds up wonderfully today."

"This is the best work of Lon Chaney since The Unholy Three, and it is a great relief to have him minus his usual sinister make-up. His characterization of Tito Flik is perfect." --- Photoplay

"Mr. Chaney, discarding for the moment his usual propensity for distorted limbs, is a properly sentimental clown." --- New York Herald Tribune

"Mr. Chaney is superb as the clown. It makes one realize his mental state vividly. The closing scenes where he is shown performing his death-defying acts, and committing suicide, are the most pathetic of them all. It should draw big crowds in any theatre and please them all". --- Harrison's Reports

"Another romantic play with a semi-tragic finale....In this case, Lon Chaney as the star should be almost an insurance of a draw. Production is excellent in Herbert Brenon's best style. Chaney does some splendid acting as the clown who makes the world laugh while his heart is breaking with a vain love...." --- Variety

"Except for an expertly filmed closing sequence...Herbert Brenon's pictorial translation of Laugh, Clown, Laugh...is a somewhat dawdling and sparkless contribution. Even Lon Chaney's undoubtedly earnest interpretation...fails to arouse the necessary sympathy...Miss Young is attractive and dainty, but her talent as an actress is not called for to any great extent in this picture." --- The New York Times

"Chaney without his crutches, Chaney the middle-aged lover, Chaney the clown, Chaney the actor! These are good entertainers, particularly the latter, and Laugh, Clown, Laugh is good entertainment...I believe I'm giving the impression that I think Mr. Chaney is a whale of an actor. If I'm not, I'm sorry, because that--at least that--is what I think he is." --- Exhibitors Herald-World

In a 1985 interview, co-star Loretta Young stated "Lon Chaney, I think, was one of the real geniuses in our business. There aren't too many of them, but I think surely he was one. I think Lon Chaney was able to separate his work from his life. When he was working, he actually was not in this world at all. He was just inside that character so if that character was up, he was up. If the character was down, he was down."

== 2002 re-score, 2003 release ==
In January 2002, the third annual Young Film Composers Competition sponsored by Turner Classic Movies awarded the right to re-score this film to a college student named Scott Salinas. In November 2002, he scored it at Todd-AO, with the film first aired in February 2003.
