= James Tinling =

American stunt performer

- Born: May 8, 1889; Seattle, Washington, U.S.
- Died: May 14, 1967 (aged 78); Los Angeles, California, U.S.
- Occupation: Film director

James Tinling (May 8, 1889, in Seattle – May 14, 1967, in Los Angeles) was an American film director. He worked during the silent period as a prop boy and stuntman, and directed primarily for 20th Century Fox in the 1930s and 1940s. He has been cited as one of the best B-film directors for Fox, known for directing numerous westerns and lighthearted films, including Charlie Chan in Shanghai (1935).

== Selected filmography ==
- Don't Marry (1928)
- Words and Music (1929)
- One Mad Kiss (1930)
- For the Love o' Lil (1930)
- The Flood (1931)
- Arizona to Broadway (1933)
- The Last Trail (1933)
- Jimmy and Sally (1933)
- Under the Pampas Moon (1935)
- Charlie Chan in Shanghai (1935)
- The Holy Terror (1937)
- 45 Fathers (1937)
- Lone Star Ranger (1942)
- Sundown Jim (1942)
- The Crime Smasher (1943)
- Rendezvous 24 (1946)
- Strange Journey (1946)
- Roses Are Red (1947)
- Trouble Preferred (1948)
- Tales of Robin Hood (May 1951)
