= God Gave Me Twenty Cents =

1926 film

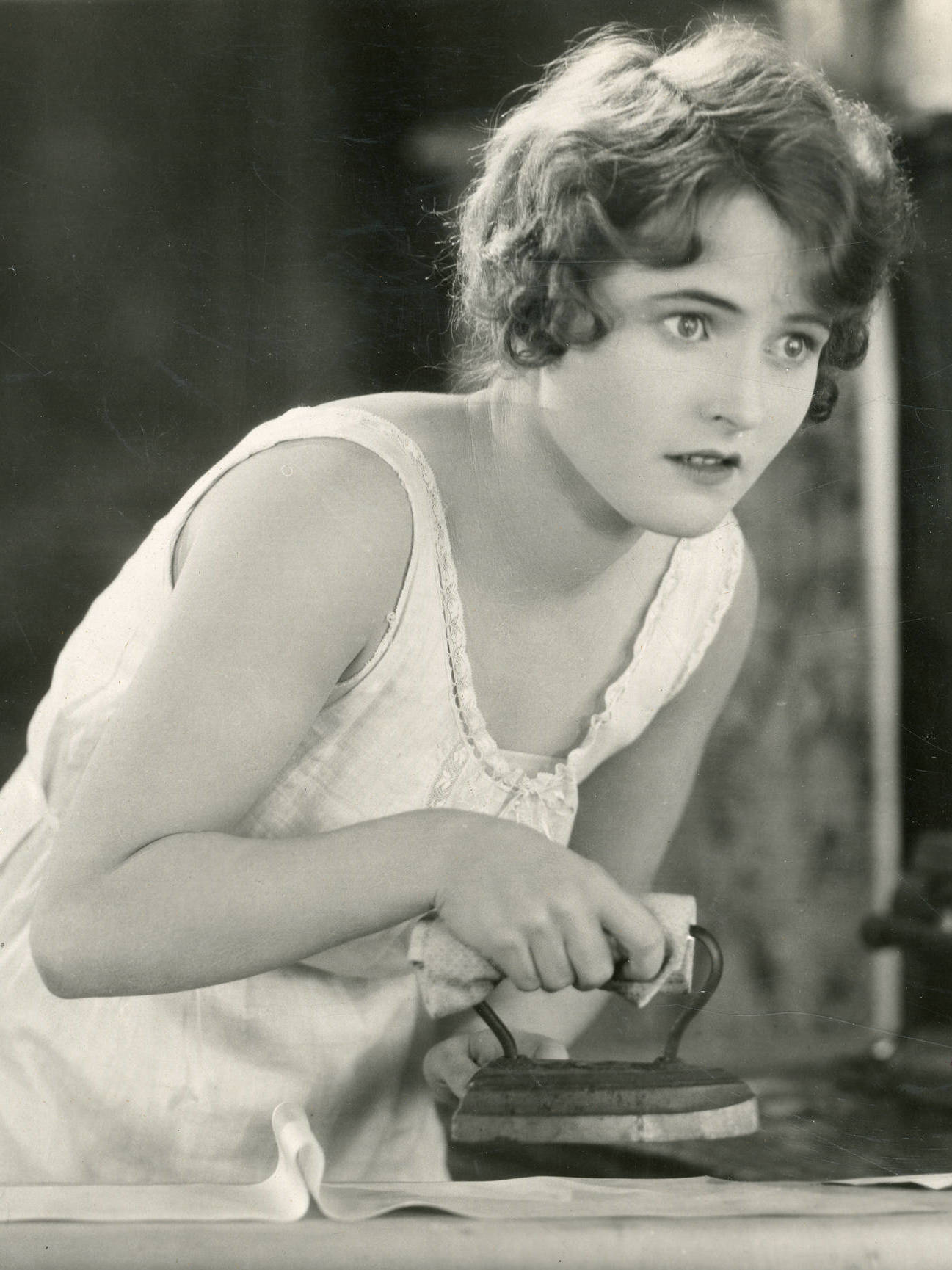
- Still with Lois Moran
- Directed by: Herbert Brenon
- Screenplay by: Elizabeth Meehan; John Russell
- Based on: God Gave Me Twenty Cents by Dixie Willson
- Produced by: Jesse L. Lasky; Adolph Zukor
- Starring: Lois Moran; Lya De Putti; Jack Mulhall; William Collier, Jr. Adrienne D'Ambricourt; Leo Feodoroff; Rosa Rosanova
- Cinematography: Leo Tover
- Production company: Famous Players–Lasky Corporation
- Distributed by: Paramount Pictures
- Release date: November 19, 1926
- Running time: 70 minutes
- Country: United States
- Language: Silent (English intertitles)

God Gave Me Twenty Cents is a 1926 American silent drama film directed by Herbert Brenon and written by Elizabeth Meehan and John Russell. The film stars Lois Moran, Lya De Putti, Jack Mulhall, William Collier, Jr., Adrienne D'Ambricourt, Leo Feodoroff, and Rosa Rosanova. The film was released on November 20, 1926, by Paramount Pictures, following a gala premiere on November 19 that opened the Paramount Theatre in Manhattan. It is based on the novel God Gave Me Twenty Cents by Dixie Willson, subsequently remade by Paramount British as a sound film Ebb Tide in 1932.

== Plot ==
As described in a film magazine review, Mary, a waitress, is sublimely happy in her love for sailor Steve, a jolly young star who surprises even himself when he marries the young Mary. Steve's old girl Cassie Lang, a patron of Ma Tapman's questionable hotel, is heartbroken and, upon her release from prison, goads Steve into gambling on whether or not he will take her to sea with him. Cassie wins, and Steve sails away the next day without a word to Mary. Mary is distraught by this and wants to die. She finds twenty cents on the pier and uses it to buy a rose for her hair. Then she is injured before she can take her own life and ends up in a hospital. There she meets Cassie who, on her deathbed, explains that she used false dimes for her wager with Steve and never sailed with him. Mary is jubilant on the return of Steve.

== Cast ==
- Lois Moran as Mary
- Lya De Putti as Cassie Lang
- Jack Mulhall as Steve Doren
- William Collier, Jr. as Barney Tapman
- Adrienne D'Ambricourt as Ma Tapman
- Leo Feodoroff as Andre Dufour
- Rosa Rosanova as Mrs. Dufour
- Claude Brooke as The Florist

== Preservation ==
With no prints of God Gave Me Twenty Cents located in any film archives, it is a lost film.
