= Franz Taibosh =

South African-born circus performer (died 1940)

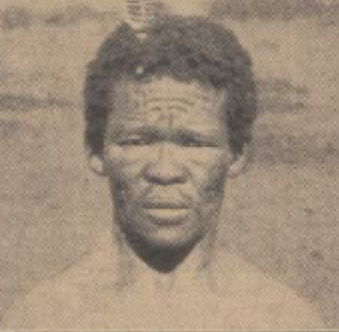
Taibosh in a 1913 publication of the Daily Mirror

Franz Taibosh (Frantz or Taaibosh; c. late 1860s–early 1870s – 1 September 1940), billed as "Clicko: the Wild Dancing Bushman", or simply "Clicko" or "Klikko", was a South African-born circus performer, noted for his short stature.

== Life and career ==
Taibosh was born c. late 1860s–early 1870s, in the Sneeuberge of what is now eastern South Africa, to a shepherd father and a mother who died shortly after birthing him. A member of the Korana, a subgroup of the Griqua people, he descended from leaders of a 17th- and 18th-century Korana clan. He spoke Khoemana.

As a child, Taibosh worked as a shepherd with his father and brothers. From the 1870s until his withdrawal from shepherding, his family's land was purchased by a series of English developers. These included Maurice James Hall, who developed it by removing a pond and releasing ostriches onto the land to control the growth of clovers, which are poisonous to sheep. Taibosh was later selected to become a housekeeper. Taibosh underwent Ulwaluko, a Xhosa rite of passage in which boys are circumcised.

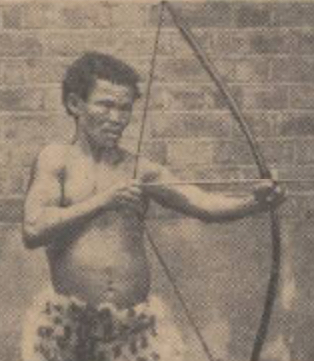
Taibosh in the 1913 publication

Taibosh claimed to have served for the British during the Second Boer War as a post rider, during which he began performing when he danced for soldiers. Following the war, he worked for farmer William Roberts until 1912, when he became a professional performer. He traveled to England in 1913 and performed his traditional dances while backed by instrumentals. Beginning in 1916, he performed in minstrel shows in the United States. Despite being Korana, The New York Times reported him as the first San to do so. He was chosen because he exemplified common stereotypes of the San: a short stature—4 ft 3 in (1.30 m); attributed to experiencing droughts throughout his childhood—wrinkly skin, and a muscular physique. He was billed as "Clicko: the Wild Dancing Bushman", or simply Clicko or Klikko, because he spoke a language with click consonants.

Taibosh contracted with Ringling Bros. and Barnum & Bailey Circus and was managed by Irishman Paddy "Captain" Hepston. Hepston did not pay him; Ringling lawyer Roy A. Cook discovered Taibosh starved in an apartment in Bridgeport, Connecticut, and terminated the contract. While in the United States, he met Daisy Earles, also a short performer. In an interview, Earles claimed he showed romantic interest, and that she rejected him because she was already married. His connection to Earles allowed Taibosh to become a fluent German speaker.

Taibosh continued working with Ringling until his retirement in 1939. In his later life, he enjoyed gardening, which he had done while housekeeping as a child. He died on 1 September 1940, with his obituary in The New York Times reporting that scientists of the American Museum of Natural History estimated him to be aged 115.

== Sources ==
- Parsons, Neil (December 2010). Clicko: The Wild Dancing Bushman. University of Chicago Press. pp. 1–13, 128. ISBN 978-0-226-64742-5.
- Parsons, Q.N. (1989). "Frantz or Klikko, The Wild Dancing Bushman: A Case Study in Khoisan Stereotyping". Botswana Notes and Records. 20: 71–76. ISSN 0525-5090. JSTOR 40979811.
