= Stolpen =

- Town
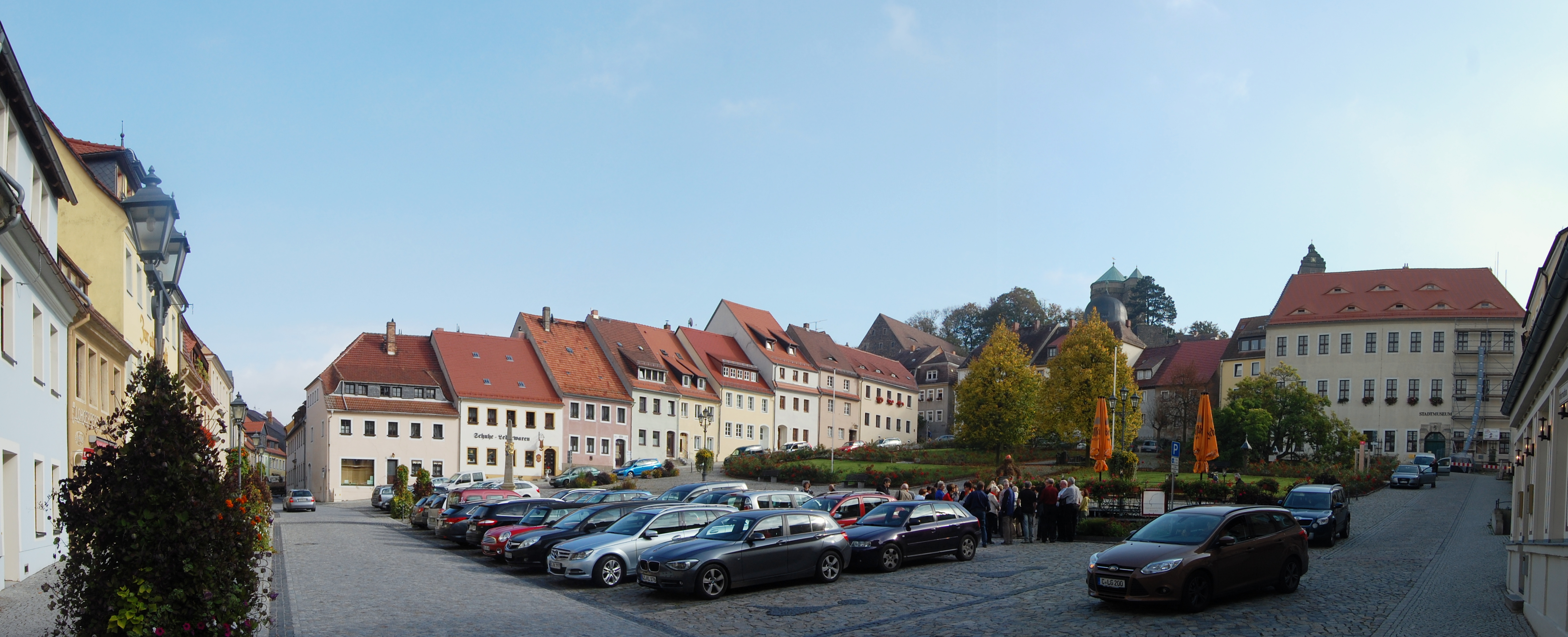
- Stolpen marketplace in October 2014

- Coat of arms

- Location of Stolpen within Sächsische Schweiz-Osterzgebirge district
- Interactive map of Stolpen
- Location within Germany Location within Saxony
- Coordinates: 51°2′56″N 14°4′58″E
- Country: Germany
- State: Saxony
- District: Sächsische Schweiz-Osterzgebirge

Government
  - Mayor (2022–29): Maik Hirdina

Area
  - Total: 60.89 km^{2} (23.51 sq mi)
- Elevation: 274 m (899 ft)

Population (2025-12-31)
  - Total: 5,405
  - Density: 88.77/km^{2} (229.9/sq mi)
- Time zone: UTC+01:00 (CET)
  - Summer (DST): UTC+02:00 (CEST)
- Postal codes: 01833
- Dialling codes: 035973
- Vehicle registration: PIR
- Website: www.stolpen.de

Stolpen (German pronunciation: [ˈʃtɔlpn̩]; Upper Sorbian: Stołpin, pronounced [ˈstɔwpʲin]) is a town in the district of Sächsische Schweiz-Osterzgebirge, in Saxony, Germany. It is a historical town, that grew at the foot of the Schloßberg with the castle Burg Stolpen.

== Burg Stolpen ==
Burg Stolpen is a castle built on top of the Schloßberg. The first defensive works were built about 1100 and it was first documented in 1222. Owned by the Bishop of Meißen for nearly 350 years, it passed to the Electorate of Saxony and was expanded in Renaissance style. In 1675 it was further expanded as a fortress. Anna Constantia von Brockdorff, Countess of Cosel, was imprisoned in the castle from 1716 until her death in 1765. The castle fell into disrepair towards the end of the 18th century. It became a museum in 1875, and has been partly restored since then.

== Schloßberg ==
Schloßberg is a hill just to the south of the town formed of prominent basalt columns. It is the formation referred to by Georgius Agricola when he coined the term basalt.

== Historical population ==
- ca. 1330 – 500
- ca. 1550 – 725
- 1559 – 122 (property owners)
- 1748 – 146 (property owners)
- 1799 – 706^{*}
- 1834 – 1220
- 1871 – 1383
- 1890 – 1401
- 1910 – 1741
- 1925 – 1833
- 1950 – 2913
- 1964 – 2705
- 1970 – 2549
- 1990 – 5890
- 1998 – 6217
- 2004 – 6196
- 2007 – 5988
- 2010 – 5793

^{*} over 10 years old

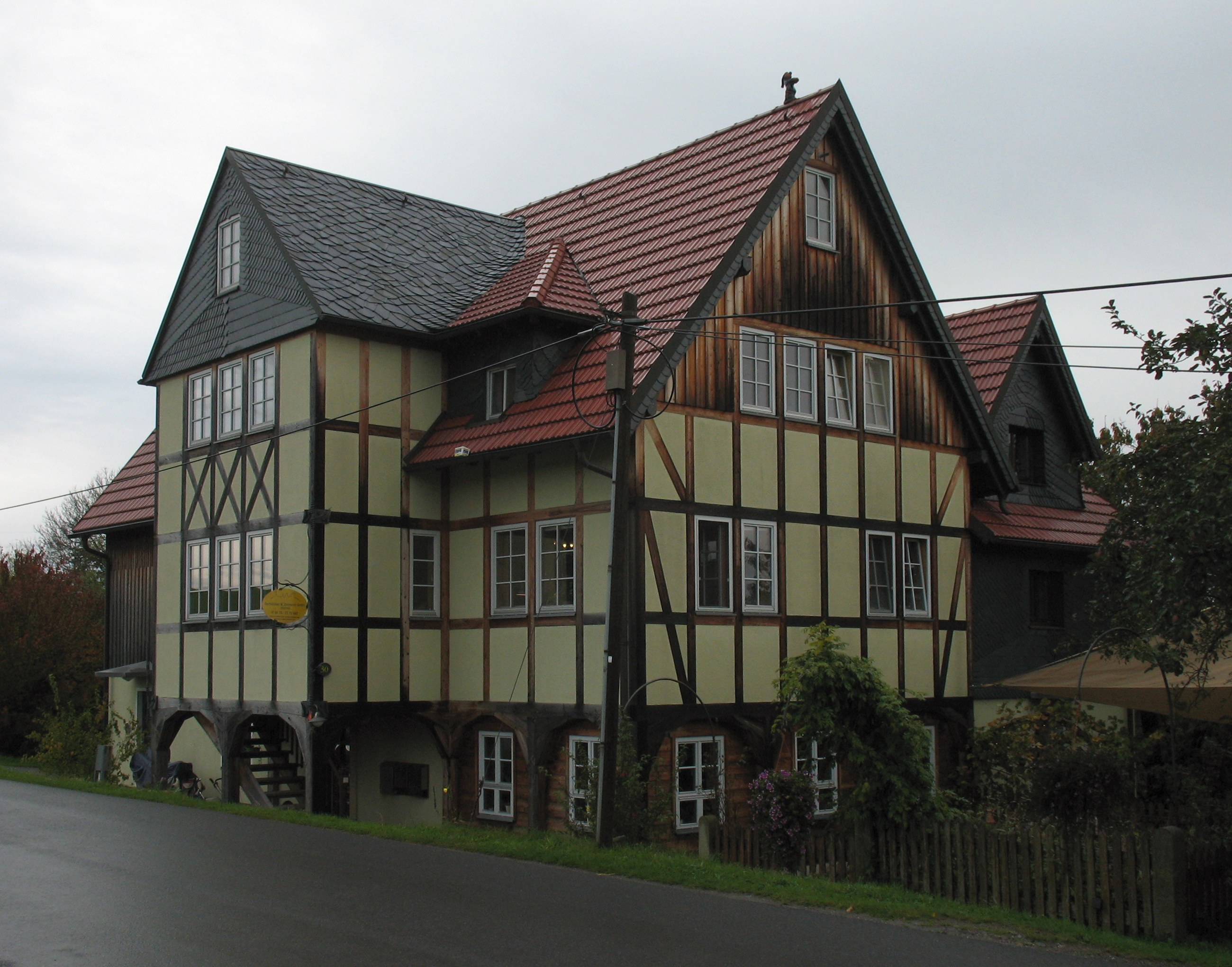
Upper Lusatian house in Helmsdorf

== Twin towns – sister cities ==
Stolpen is twinned with:

- Hilzingen, Germany
- Amöneburg, Germany
- Garching an der Alz, Germany
- Jockgrim, Germany
- Sipplingen, Germany
- Sloup v Čechách, Czech Republic

== Notable people ==
- Walter von Boetticher (1853–1945), historian and physician, was a general practitioner at Stolpen
- The Doll Family, a circus sideshow act, were born in Stolpen
- Christian Friedrich Henrici, also known as Picander, Bach's librettist (St Matthew Passion's text was written by him) was born here.
