= Oregon Book Award =

Literary award for writers from Oregon, United States

- Awarded for: Literary excellence
- Country: United States
- Presented by: Literary Arts and Oregon
- First award: 1987
- Website: Literary-arts.org

The Oregon Book Awards are presented annually by the Portland, Oregon, United States–based organization Literary Arts, Inc. to honor the "state's finest accomplishments by Oregon writers who work in genres of poetry, fiction, graphic literature, drama, literary nonfiction, and literature for young readers."

Oregon Book Award was founded in 1987 by Brian Booth and Oregon Institute for Literary Arts (OILA). In 1993, Literary Arts, Inc., a statewide non-profit organization dedicated to enriching the lives of Oregonians through language and literature, joined with the OILA and continued to support and promote Oregon's authors with the book awards and Oregon Literary Fellowships. Award winners are selected based solely on literary merit by out-of-state judges who change each year.

In 2005, the award ceremony was moved from Portland's Scottish Rite Center to the Wonder Ballroom, in an effort to make it more lively and fun. Since 2009, the awards ceremony has been held at the Gerding Theatre at the Armory, the home of Portland Center Stage.

== Recipients ==
=== Book Awards ===
==== Stafford/Hall Award for Poetry ====
Year	Book	Author
1987	Seal Rock	John Haislip
1988	Singing the Mozart Requiem	Ingrid Wendt
1989	The Admiration's	Lex Runciman
1990	Dreamer	Primus St. John
1990	Toluca Street	Maxine Scates
1991	Psyche Drives the Coast	Sharon Doubiago
1992	Selected Poems	Vern Rutsala
1993	A Book of Other Days	Lisa M. Steinman
1994	Lauds	Tom Crawford
1995	Poem Rising Out of the Earth and Standing Up in Someone	James Grabill
1996	Journeyman's Wages	Clemens Starck
1997	Drawing the Line	Lawson Fusao Inada
1998	Cocktails with Brueghel at the Museum Café	Sandra Stone
1999	Ruining the Picture	Pimone Triplett
2000	Passion	Judith Montgomery
2001	The Evening Light	Floyd Skloot
2002	In The Margins Of The World	Willa Schneberg
2003	The Play of Dark and Light	Rita Ott Ramstad
2004	Men Holding Eggs	Henry Hughes
2005	Leaving	Laton Carter
2006	Facts About the Moon	Dorianne Laux
2007	The Sky Position	Tom Blood
2008	A is for Anne: Mistress Hutchinson Disturbs the Commonwealth	Penelope Scambly Schott
2009/2010	All-American Poem	Matthew Dickman
2011	The Book of Men and Women	David Biespiel
2012	Curses And Wishes	Carl Adamshick
2013	Fjords Vol. 1	Zachary Schomburg
2014	Incarnadine	Mary Szybist
2015	Sorrow Arrow	Emily Kendal Frey
2016	Saint Friend	Carl Adamshick
2017	When We Were Birds	Joe Wilkins
2018	Field Theories	Samiya Bashir
2019	Small Gods	Matthew Minicucci
2020	Spectra	Ashley Toliver
2021	Hope of Stones	Anna Elkins
2022	Instrument	Dao Strom
2023	Mouth, Sugar, and Smoke	Eric Tran
2024	Chorus	Daniela Naomi Molnar

==== Award for Fiction ====
Year	Book	Author
1987	Resurrectionists	Russell Working
1988	Within Normal Limits	Todd Grimson
1989	Cardinal Numbers	Hob Broun
1990	The Jump-off Creek	Molly Gloss
1991	(no award given)	
1992	Searoad	Ursula K. Le Guin
1993	Dreams Like Thunder	Diane Simmons
1994	Arabian Jazz	Diana Abu-Jaber
1995	Native Speaker	Chang-Rae Lee
1996	What Falls Away	Tracy Daugherty
1997	Fight Club	Chuck Palahniuk
1998	The Ugliest House in the World	Peter Ho Davies
1999	Like Never Before	Ehud Havazelet
2000	Storm Riders	Craig Lesley
2001	Throwing Knives	Molly Best Tinsley
2002	The Necessary Grace to Fall: Stories	Gina Ochsner

===== Ken Kesey Award for the Novel =====
Year	Book	Author
2003	His Mother's Son	Cai Emmons
2004	Axeman's Jazz	Tracy Daugherty
2005	How I Paid for College: A Novel of Sex, Theft, Friendship, and Musical Theater	Marc Acito
2006	The Best People in the World: A Novel	Justin Tussing
2007	Twenty Questions	Alison Clement

===== Ken Kesey Award for Fiction =====
Year	Book	Author
2008	Bearing the Body	Ehud Havazelet
2009/2010	Livability: Stories	Jon Raymond
2011	Lean on Pete	Willy Vlautin
2012	The Sisters Brothers	Patrick deWitt
2013	Shards	Ismet Prcic
2014	The Unreal and The Real: Collected Stories, Vols. 1 and 2	Ursula K. Le Guin
2015	The Revolution of Every Day	Cari Luna
2016	The Small Backs of Children	Lidia Yuknavitch
2017	A Great Length of Time	Joyce Cherry Cresswell
2018	American War	Omar El Akkad
2019	Red Clocks	Leni Zumas
2020	No God like the Mother	Kesha Ajọsẹ Fisher
2021	The Great Offshore Grounds	Vanessa Veselka
2022	What Strange Paradise	Omar El Akkad
2023	Seeking Fortune Elsewhere: Stories	Sindya Bhanoo
2024	The Librarianist	Patrick deWitt
2025	We Were the Universe	Kimberly King Parsons
2026	Immaculate Conception	Ling Ling Huang

===== H. L. Davis Award for Short Fiction =====
Year	Book	Author
1998	The Ugliest House in the World	Peter Ho Davies
1999	Like Never Before	Ehud Havazelet
2000	Storm Riders	Craig Lesley
2001	Throwing Knives	Molly Best Tinsley
2002	The Necessary Grace to Fall	Gina Ochsner
2003	It Takes a Worried Man	Tracy Daugherty
2004	Saving Stanley	Scott Nadelson
2005	Resistance	Barry Lopez
2006	People I Wanted to Be	Gina Ochsner
2007	The Dead Fish Museum	Charles D'Ambrosio

==== Award for Literary Nonfiction ====
Year	Book	Author
1987	Arctic Dreams	Barry Lopez
1988	Faces of a Reservation	Cynthia Stowell
1989	A Golden Journey	Luther Cressman
1990	Baja Journey	Robin Carey
1991	Wings for My Flight / My Country, My Right to Serve	Marcy Cottrell Houle / Mary Ann Humphrey (tie)
1992	No Duty to Retreat	Richard M. Brown
1993	The Trail Home	John Daniel
1994	Stubborn Twig	Lauren Kessler
1995	Voyage of a Summer Sun	Robin Cody
1996	Volcano	Garrett Hongo
1997	Looking After	John Daniel
1998	Making It Home	Lars Nordström
1999	The Left Hand of Eden	William Ashworth
2000	The Night Gardener	Marjorie Sandor
2001	When Broken Glass Floats	Chanrithy Him
2002	My Wars Are Laid Away in Books	Alfred Habegger

===== Frances Fuller Victor Award for General Nonfiction =====
Frances Fuller Victor's legacy was invoked in a speech by scholar Terrence O'Donnell at the inaugural Oregon Book Award event in 1987, which also marked the beginning of the annual Frances Fuller Victor Award for Creative Nonfiction. The award was variously referred to by this name as well as the Frances Fuller Victor Award for General Nonfiction.

Year	Book	Author
2003	Dispatches and Dictators: Ralph Barnes for the Herald Tribune	Barbara S. Mahoney
2004	In Search of Ancient Oregon	Ellen Morris Bishop
2005	Plague and Fire: Battling Black Death and the 1900 Burning of Honolulu's Chinatown	James C. Mohr
2006	Modern Passings: Death Rites, Politics, and Social Change in Imperial Japan	Andrew Bernstein
2007	Democracy Reborn: The Fourteenth Amendment and the Fight for Equal Rights in Post-Civil War America	Garrett Epps
2008	One Night in America: Robert Kennedy, Cesar Chavez, and the Dream of Dignity	Steven W. Bender
2009/2010	Hiding Man: A Biography of Donald Barthelme	Tracy Daugherty
2011	Savages and Scoundrels	Paul VanDevelder
2012	Imperial Japan At Its Zenith: The Wartime Celebration Of The Empire's 2600th Anniversary	Kenneth J. Ruoff
2013	The Wrecking Crew: The Inside Story of Rock and Roll's Best-Kept Secret	Kent Hartman
2014	Duel with the Devil	Paul Collins
2015	Big Little Man: In Search of My Asian Self	Alex Tizon
2016	A Long High Whistle	David Biespiel
2017	The Last Love Song: A Biography of Joan Didion	Tracy Daugherty
2018	Fish Market	Lee van der Voo
2019	Dangerous Subjects: James D. Saules and the Rise of Black Exclusion in Oregon	Kenneth R. Coleman
2020	Aloha Rodeo: Three Hawaiian Cowboys, the World's Greatest Rodeo, and a Hidden History of the American West	David Wolman and Julian Smith
2021	The Fire Is upon Us: James Baldwin, William F. Buckley Jr., and the Debate over Race in America	Nicholas Buccola
2022	The Wretched Atom: America's Global Gamble with Peaceful Nuclear Technology	Jacob Darwin Hamblin
2023	Free: Two Years, Six Lives, and the Long Journey Home	Lauren Kessler
2024	Where We Call Home: Lands, Seas, and Skies of the Pacific Northwest	Josephine Woolington

===== Sarah Winnemucca Award for Creative Nonfiction =====
Year	Book	Author
2003	Providence of a Sparrow	Chris Chester
2003	In The Shadow Of Memory	Floyd Skloot
2004	The Stuff of Life	Karen Karbo
2005	The Pine Island Paradox	Kathleen Dean Moore
2006	When the River Ran Wild! Indian Traditions on the Mid-Columbia and the Warm Springs Reservation	George W. Aguilar
2007	The Things Between Us	Lee Montgomery
2008	Dancing with Rose: Finding Life in the Land of Alzheimer's	Lauren Kessler
2009/2010	Convictions: A Prosecutor's Battles Against Mafia Killers, Drug Kingpins, and Enron Thieves	John Kroger
2011	The Far Corner	John Daniel
2012	The Shape Of The Eye: Down Syndrome, Family, And The Stories We Inherit	George Estreich
2013	Crazy Enough	Storm Large
2014	Wedlocked	Jay Ponteri
2015	The Great Floodgates of the Wonderworld	Justin Hocking
2016	Objects in Mirror Are Closer Than They Appear	Kate Carroll de Gutes
2017	Angels With Dirty Faces	Walidah Imarisha
2018	Animals Strike Curious Poses	Elena Passarello
2019	The Gospel of Trees	Apricot Irving
2020	Anxious Attachments	Beth Alvarado
2021	Yellow Bird: Oil, Murder, and a Woman's Search for Justice in Indian Country	Sierra Crane Murdoch
2022	Plastic: An Autobiography	Allison Cobb
2023	Diary of a Misfit: A Memoir and a Mystery	Casey Parks
2024	Wolfish: Wolf, Self, and the Stories We Tell About Fear	Erica Berry

==== Angus L. Bowmer Award for Drama ====
Year	Book	Author
1988	The Second Coming of Joan of Arc	Carolyn Gage
1989	Holding Patterns	Dan Duling
1990	Five Minute Wars	Sharon Whitney
1992	The Disappearance and Death of Amelia Earhart	E. J. Westlake
1994	A Pirate's Lullaby	Jessica Litwak
1996	Picasso in the Backseat	Dmae Roberts
1997	Drawing Down Clio	Doug Baldwin
1998	Freud's Girls	Dori Appel
1999	The Lunatic Within	Dori Appel
2000	Wonderbroads	Melinda Pittman
2001	Lost and Found	Dori Appel
2004	Vitriol and Violets	Shelly Lipkin, Louanne Moldovan, and Sherry Lamoreaux
2006	Arthur's Dreams	Richard Moeschl
2008	Lost Wavelengths	Steve Patterson
2011	The Lost Boy	Susan Mach
2013	Antarktikos	Andrea Stolowitz
2015	Ithaka	Andrea Stolowitz
2017	Words That Burn	Cindy Williams Gutiérrez
2019	Successful Strategies	Andrea Stolowitz
2021	You Cannot Undo This Action	Conor Eifler
2023	The Storyteller	Sara Jean Accuardi

==== Award for Young Readers Literature ====
Year	Book	Author
1990	Dragon's Milk	Susan Fletcher
1991	Four Dollars and Fifty Cents	Eric Kimmel
1992	The Striped Ships	Eloise McGraw
1993	Blue Skin of the Sea	Graham Salisbury
1994	Make Lemonade	Virginia Euwer Wolff
1995	Under the Blood Red Sun	Graham Salisbury
1996	Journey of the Red Wolf	Roland Smith
1997	The Moorchild	Eloise McGraw
1998	Shark Bait	Graham Salisbury
1999	A Voice from the Border	Pamela Smith Hill
2000	The Gate in the Wall	Ellen Howard
2001	True Believer	Virginia Euwer Wolff

===== Eloise Jarvis McGraw Award for Children's Literature =====
Year	Book	Author
2003	Three Samurai Cats	Eric Kimmel
2004	Luba	Michelle McCann
2005	Cave Paintings to Picasso	Henry Sayre
2006	Tour America	Diane Siebert
2007	Not in Room 204	Shannon Riggs
2008	A Day With No Crayons	Elizabeth Rusch
2009/2010	Keep On! The Story of Matthew Henson, Co-discoverer of the North Pole	Deborah Hopkinson
2011	Calvin Coconut: The Zippy Fix	Graham Salisbury
2012	Calvin Coconut: Hero Of Hawaii	Graham Salisbury
2013	Drawing From Memory	Allen Say
2014	Calvin Coconut: Extra Famous	Graham Salisbury
2015	Whistle in the Dark	Susan Hill Long
2016	With a Friend by Your Side	Barbara Kerley
2017	Hannah and Sugar	Kate Berube
2018	The Tragically True Adventures of Kit Donovan	Patricia Bailey
2019	The Turning	Emily Whitman
2020	Lowriders: Blast from the Past	Cathy Camper
2021	A Game of Fox and Squirrels	Jenn Reese
2022	Taylor Before and After	Jennie Englund
2023	Friends Are Friends, Forever	Dane Liu
2024	Too Early	Nora Ericson

===== Leslie Bradshaw Award for Young Adult Literature =====
Year	Book	Author
2002	Empress of the World	Sara Ryan
2003	The Voyage of Patience Goodspeed	Heather Vogel Frederick
2004	Deep	Susanna Vance
2005	A Heart for Any Fate	Linda Crew
2006	Eyes of the Emperor	Graham Salisbury
2007	Alphabet of Dreams	Susan Fletcher
2008	The Rules for Hearts	Sara Ryan
2008	A Taste for Rabbit	Linda Zuckerman
2009/2010	I.Q. Book One: Independence Hall	Roland Smith
2011	The Last Great Getaway of the Water Balloon Boys	Scott William Carter
2012	Wildwing	Emily Whitman
2013	Blue Thread	Ruth Tenzer Feldman
2014	The Theory of Everything	Kari Luna
2015	The Body In the Woods	April Henry
2016	Martin Marten	Brian Doyle
2017	Courage & Defiance: Stories of Spies, Saboteurs, and Survivors in World War II Denmark	West Linn
2018	Strange the Dreamer	Laini Taylor
2019	The Wicked Deep	Shea Ernshaw
2020	How I Became A Spy: A Mystery of WWII London	Deborah Hopkinson
2021	The Sullivan Sisters	Kathryn Ormsbee
2022	The Dead and the Dark	Courtney Gould
2023	Dream, Annie, Dream	Waka T. Brown
2024	The Very Unfortunate Wish of Melony Yoshimura	Waka T. Brown

==== Pacific Northwest College of Art Graphic Literature Award ====
Year	Book	Author
2012	Footnotes in Gaza	Joe Sacco
2014	Hereville: How Mirka Met a Meteorite	Barry Deutsch
2016	The Zoo Box	Ariel Cohn and Aron Nels Steinke
2018	Fetch: How A Bad Dog Brought Me Home	Nicole J. Georges
2020	Penny Nichols	Greg Means and M. K. Reed
2022	Trespassers	Breena Bard
2024	The Faint of Heart	Kerilynn Wilson

==== Readers Choice Award ====
Year	Book	Author
2011	Lean on Pete	Willy Vlautin
2012	The Chronology Of Water	Lidia Yuknavitch
2013	Wild: From Lost to Found on the Pacific Crest Trail	Cheryl Strayed
2014	The Orchardist	Amanda Coplin
2015	The Free	Willy Vlautin
2016	The Small Backs of Children: A Novel	Lidia Yuknavitch
2017	A Series of Small Maneuvers	Eliot Treichel
2018	Fetch: How A Bad Dog Brought Me Home	Nicole J. Georges
2019	Ladder to the Light	Beth Wood

=== Special awards ===
1988: William Everson
1989: George Venn
1990: Mary Barnard
1991: Don James
1992: Paul Pintarich
1994: Ralph Friedman
1995: Wilma Erwin

==== Charles Erskine Scott Wood Distinguished Writer Award ====
1987: George Belknap
1988: Dorothy Johansen
1989: Vi Gale
1990: Janet Stevenson
1991: Walt Morey
1992: Terence O'Donnell
1993: Alvin M. Josephy, Jr.
1994: Earl Pomeroy
1995: Damon Knight
1996: Eloise McGraw
1998: Priscilla Knuth
1999: Ken Kesey
2003: George Hitchcock
2006: Ursula K. Le Guin
2008: Barry Lopez
2014: Vern Rutsala
2015: Ralph Salisbury
2017: Jarold Ramsey
2020: Lawson Fusao Inada
2021: Molly Gloss

==== Stewart H. Holbrook Literary Legacy Award ====
1987: Northwest Review
1988: Calyx, A Journal of Art & Literature
1989: Katharine McCanna
1990: Sandra Williams
1991: Walt Curtis
1992: Clyde Rice
1993: Penny Avila
1994: George Venn
1995: Tom Ferte
1996: Brian Booth
1997: Ruth Gundle & Judith Barrington
1998: Dennis & Linny Stovall
1999: Peter Sears
2000: Rich Wandschneider
2001: Erik Muller
2002: Carla Perry
2003: David Hedges
2004: David Milholland
2005: Barbara LaMorticella
2006: Paulann Petersen
2007: Kim Stafford
2008: Marlene Howard
2009: Matt Love
2011: John Laursen
2013: Larry Colton
2014: Vince & Patty Wixon
2015: Tom Spanbauer
2016: Douglas Spangle
2017: The Independent Publishing Resource Center
2018: Tracey Daugherty and Marjorie Sandor
2019: José González
2020: Write Around Portland
2021: Elizabeth Lyon
2023: Gary Miranda
2024: Ellen Waterston

==== Walt Morey Young Readers Literary Legacy Award ====
1998: Barbara J. McKillip
1999: Claudia Jones
2000: Cathy Schneider
2001: Oregon advisory boards of First Book
2002: Ready to Learn
2003: Jerry Isom
2004: Patricia R. Gallagher
2005: Carol Brown
2006: John Monteverde
2007: Mark Mizell
2008: Young Writers Association
2009: The Dove Lewis Read to the Dogs Program
2011: The Children's Book Bank
2012: Ulrich Hardt
2013: Oregon Battle of the Books
2014: Ellen Fader
2015: Jann Tankersley
2016: Curtis Kiefer
2017: The SMART (Start Making A Reader Today) Program
2018: Carmen T. Bernier-Grand
2020: Reading Results
2021: PlayWrite, Inc.
2023: Dawn Babb Prochovnic

=== Literary Fellowships ===
==== C. Hamilton Bailey Fellowship in Poetry ====
2018: Matthew Minicucci
2019: Pamela K. Santos
2020: Alicia Jo Rabins
2021: Amy Miller

==== Edna L. Homes Fellowship in Young Readers ====
2018: Erica A. Briggs
2019: Amy Baskin
2020: Kelly Garrett
2021: Shana Targosz

==== Fellowship in Fiction ====
2018: Omar El Akkad and Adair V

==== Fellowship in Poetry ====
2018: manuel arturo abreu, Danielle Cadena Deulen, and Milo R. Muise

==== Fellowship in Publishing ====
2018: Clackamas Literary Review and Pacifica: Poetry International
2019: Atelier 26 Books and Opossum: A Literary Marsupial
2020: Fonograf Editions and Octopus Books
2021: Forest Avenue Press and Northwest Review

==== Fellowship in Nonfiction ====
2018: Elizabeth Enslin, Susan Shepard, and Brian Trapp
2019: Sterling Cunio and Justin Taylor
2020: Garet Lahvis

==== Laurell Swails and Donald Monroe Memorial Fellowship in Fiction ====
2018: Takashi L. Kendrick and Mika Tanner
2019: Ana-Maurine Lara and Chris Stuck
2020: Cynthia L. Brown and Taylor Koekkoek
2021: Pedro Hoffmeister and Emily Woodworth

==== Leslie Bradshaw Fellowship ====
2018: Alberto Yáñez (for nonfiction)
2019: Chelsea Biondolillo (for nonfiction)
2020: Rachael Carnes (for drama)
2021: Sara Jean Accuardi (for drama)

==== Oregon Arts Commission Fellowship ====
2018: Jacob Aiello and Jake Vermaas
2019: Karen Luper and Marcus Lund
2020: Marjorie Celona and Gabriel Urza

==== Oregon Literary Career Fellowship ====
2020: Beth Alvarado and Dao Strom
2021: Annie Sheppard and Sandy Tanaka

==== Oregon Poetry Community Fellowship ====
2019: Jennifer Perrine
2021: Alyssa Ogi

==== Walt Morey Fellowship ====
2018: Cindy Baldwin (for drama)
2019: Stacy Brewster (for drama)
2020: Jamie Cooper (for poetry)
2021: Scott Korb (for nonfiction)

==== Women Writers Fellowship ====
2018: Naomi Ulsted
2019: Natalie Hirt
2020: Eliza Rotterman
2021: A. M. Rosales

==== Writers of Color Fellowship ====
2018: Reema Zaman
2019: Christopher Rose
2020: Olufunke Grace Bankole
2021: Kesha Ajose-Fisher
