= Cindy Williams (disambiguation) =

Cindy Williams (1947–2023) was an American actress, known for her role on Laverne & Shirley.

Cindy Williams may also refer to:

== People ==
- Cindy Williams (journalist) (born 1963), American former news anchor
- Cindy Williams Gutiérrez, American poet and dramatist

== Fictional characters ==
- Cindy Williams (EastEnders), a fictional character on the British soap opera EastEnders
- Cindy Beale, also Williams, a fictional character on the British soap opera EastEnders

== See also ==
- Cynda Williams (born 1966), American television and film actress
- Cyndi Williams, American voice actress and script writer
