= Dydia DeLyser =

American writer

Dydia DeLyser is a cultural-historical geographer, writer and researcher based in Los Angeles, California. An expert on the cultural impact of Helen Hunt Jackson's novel Ramona and the history of neon signage, DeLyser is an associate professor at California State University, Fullerton in the Department of Geography & the Environment.

A pilot herself and expert in early female aviators, she served as associate producer for the 2009 film The Legend of Pancho Barnes and the Happy Bottom Riding Club, a documentary about Pancho Barnes, a female pilot from the early 20th century.

DeLyser has written extensively about the California "ghost town" Bodie as well as about the process of historic motorcycle and automotive restoration, together with her partner Paul Greenstein. The 1941 Tatra T87 (a rare vehicle from Czechoslovakia) that they own and restored won the 2010 award for Collectible Car of the Year from the New York Times.
