= Justin Hocking =

Justin Hocking may refer to:

- Justin Hocking (ice hockey) (born 1974), Canadian ice hockey defenceman
- Justin Hocking (writer) (born 1973), American essayist and writer
