= Shea Ernshaw =

American novelist

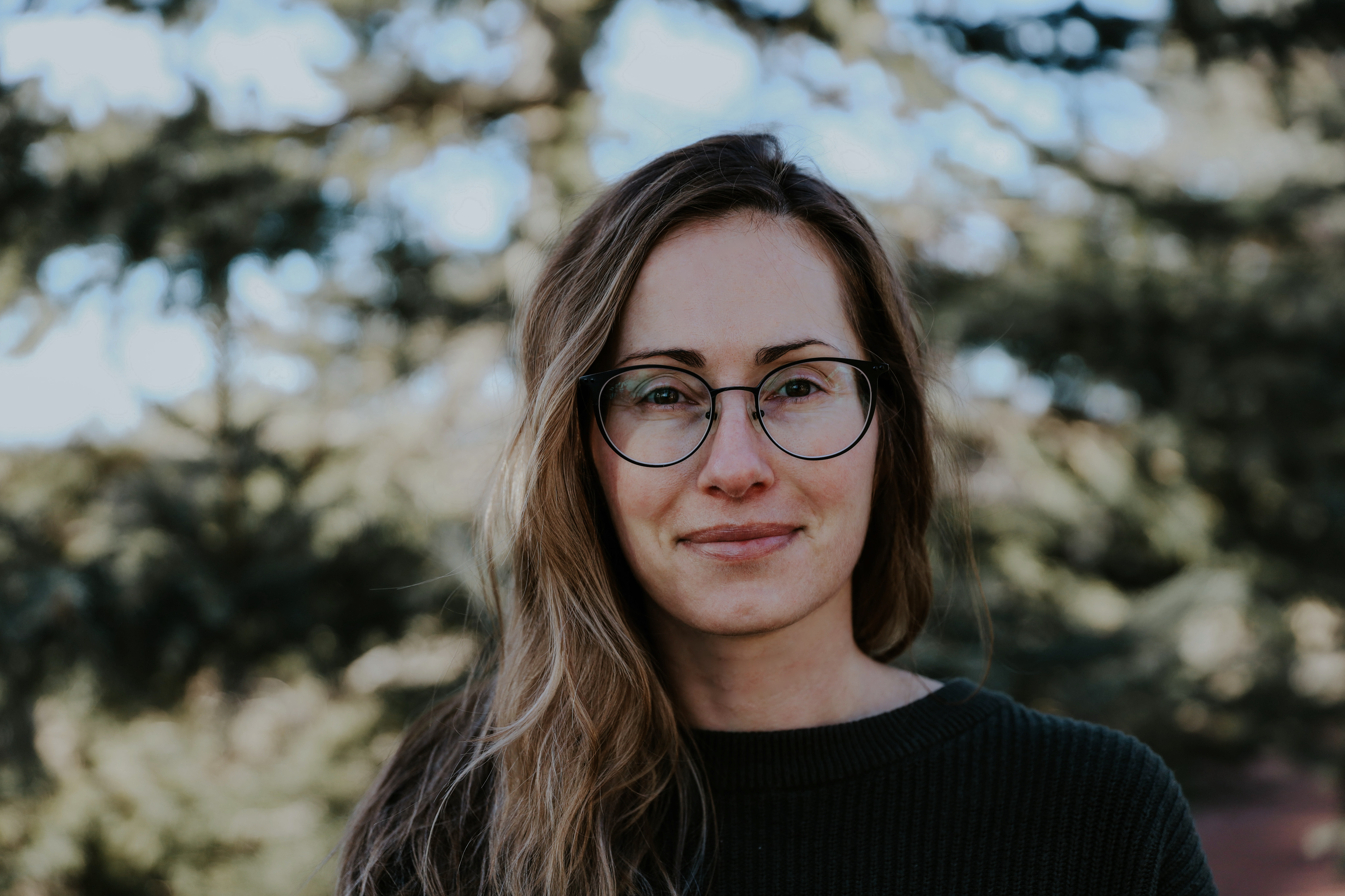
- Ernshaw in 2021
- Born: Shea Ernshaw
- Occupation: Novelist
- Writing career
- Language: English
- Notable work: The Wicked Deep
- Notable awards: Oregon Book Award
- Website: www.sheaernshaw.com

Shea Ernshaw is a #1 New York Times, USA Today, and Indie bestselling author known for her novels The Wicked Deep and Long Live The Pumpkin Queen, which was a sequel to Tim Burton's classic film The Nightmare Before Christmas. Her books have been published in over twenty countries, and her novels A History of Wild Places, The Wicked Deep, and Winterwood were Indie Next Picks.

The Wicked Deep won the Oregon Book Award for Young Readers in 2019.

== Works ==
=== Adult novels ===
- A History of Wild Places

=== Young Adult novels ===
- The Beautiful Maddening
- Long Live the Pumpkin Queen
- A Wilderness of Stars
- Winterwood
- The Wicked Deep
