= Happy Bottom Riding Club =

Dude ranch at Edwards Air Force Base

Coordinates: 34°51′49.80″N 117°57′22.74″W

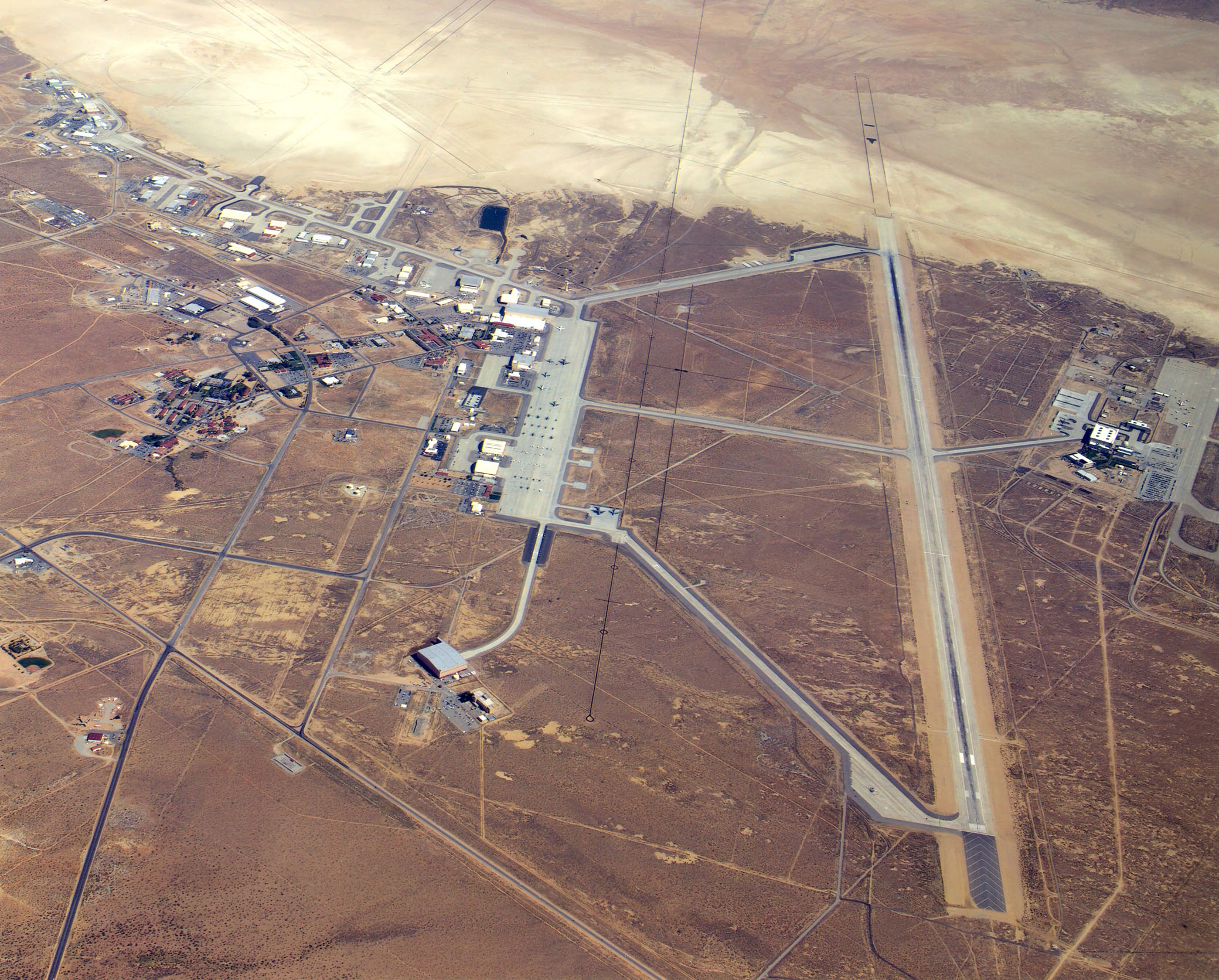
Pilot's view of Edwards Air Force Base, showing the main base area, located beside Rogers Dry Lake.

The Happy Bottom Riding Club (1935–1953), was a dude ranch, restaurant, and hotel operated by aviator Florence "Pancho" Barnes near Edwards Air Force Base in the Antelope Valley of California's Mojave Desert. (Note: "Oro Verde" is Spanish for "green gold".) Barnes and her club were featured in Tom Wolfe's 1979 book, The Right Stuff, and its 1983 film adaptation.

Also known as the Rancho Oro Verde Fly-Inn Dude Ranch, the establishment was a favored hangout of test pilots and the Hollywood elite during the 1940s, boasting over 9,000 members worldwide at the height of its popularity. When the United States Air Force intended to buy the club via eminent domain in order to extend their runways, a long and contentious series of lawsuits ensued. Barnes eventually won the lawsuits, but after the club was destroyed by fire in the 1950s, her plans to re-open in a nearby location never came to fruition.

== Establishment ==
In 1935, Barnes originally purchased the property where the club would later stand to grow alfalfa, raise pigs and cattle and start a dairy. As the nearby U.S. Army Air Corps base at Muroc Army Air Base expanded in the post World War II period, the ranch's other business as a restaurant, bar, and hotel quickly outgrew its humble beginnings. Eventually, the ranch also included a hospitality business with an all-female staff and it became a destination of choice for test pilot relaxation.

== Amenities ==
Along with a swimming pool and a rodeo stadium, Rancho Oro Verde had an airstrip that was the first amenity Barnes created in 1935 to stay in touch with her aviator-friendly social circle from south of the San Gabriel Mountains. Visiting civilians and military men alike flew into the strip to stay at the Rancho Oro Verde, with Barnes often holding events to entertain her guests that included barbecues and a treasure hunt for 200 silver dollars. The rodeo stadium held three-day weekend rodeos jointly sponsored by the local VFW post in Lancaster.

The original swimming pool was rectangular, and was one of the first built in the Antelope Valley, but was destroyed by the 1952 Kern County earthquake. The replacement pool was circular and had a circular ramp which reportedly allowed Barnes to ride her horse into the pool. This later pool was modeled after one Barnes had owned in the Pasadena area. The pool was lit at night — an aid to visual air navigation.

As depicted in the book and film The Right Stuff, a tradition was started when Chuck Yeager broke the sound barrier in the Bell X-1 and Barnes provided him with a free steak dinner. After that, pilots were given a free steak dinner when they personally broke the sound barrier for the first time. Following Yeager's achievement, the sound barrier was broken frequently from Edwards AFB in the late 1940s and early 1950s with Barnes giving free dinners multiple times during the course of a week.

== Fire and sale ==
The remains of the Happy Bottom Riding Club (1990s), showing the extent of the fire that ravaged the main buildings and left the estate in a much-depleted condition.

Despite a friendship between Barnes and the military, relations grew sour after a change of command in 1952, four years after Muroc Army Air Base became Edwards Air Force Base. One reason for friction between Barnes and the base commander was the increase in flights out of Edwards, along with an increase in flights at the club's landing strip. After he assumed command at the base, General Albert Boyd, an admirer and friend of Barnes, would berate her if her clientele came too close to military airspace and flight paths. Allegations surfaced that the club was a brothel, something Barnes believed was connected to her refusal to sell the ranch to the government for a runway expansion. The rules Barnes posted for hostesses were strict, and many seemed to discredit the allegations. Acting on the rumors, however, the Air Force prohibited servicemen from visiting the club, destroying the vast majority of her business. Since she and the government were in the middle of negotiations regarding establishing a fair price for her business and property, Barnes felt betrayed by the prohibition.

When the government added a suit to appropriate the ranch, Barnes counter-sued for slander, harassment, unlawful acquisition of land, and conspiracy. The ranch was destroyed by fire on November 13, 1953, shortly before the lawsuit concluded. Barnes ended up resettling in nearby Cantil and the land was purchased by the Air Force via eminent domain. The proposed runway expansion was never implemented.

Barnes' plans to reestablish the Happy Bottom Riding Club on her and her husband's land in Cantil never materialized.

== Legacy ==
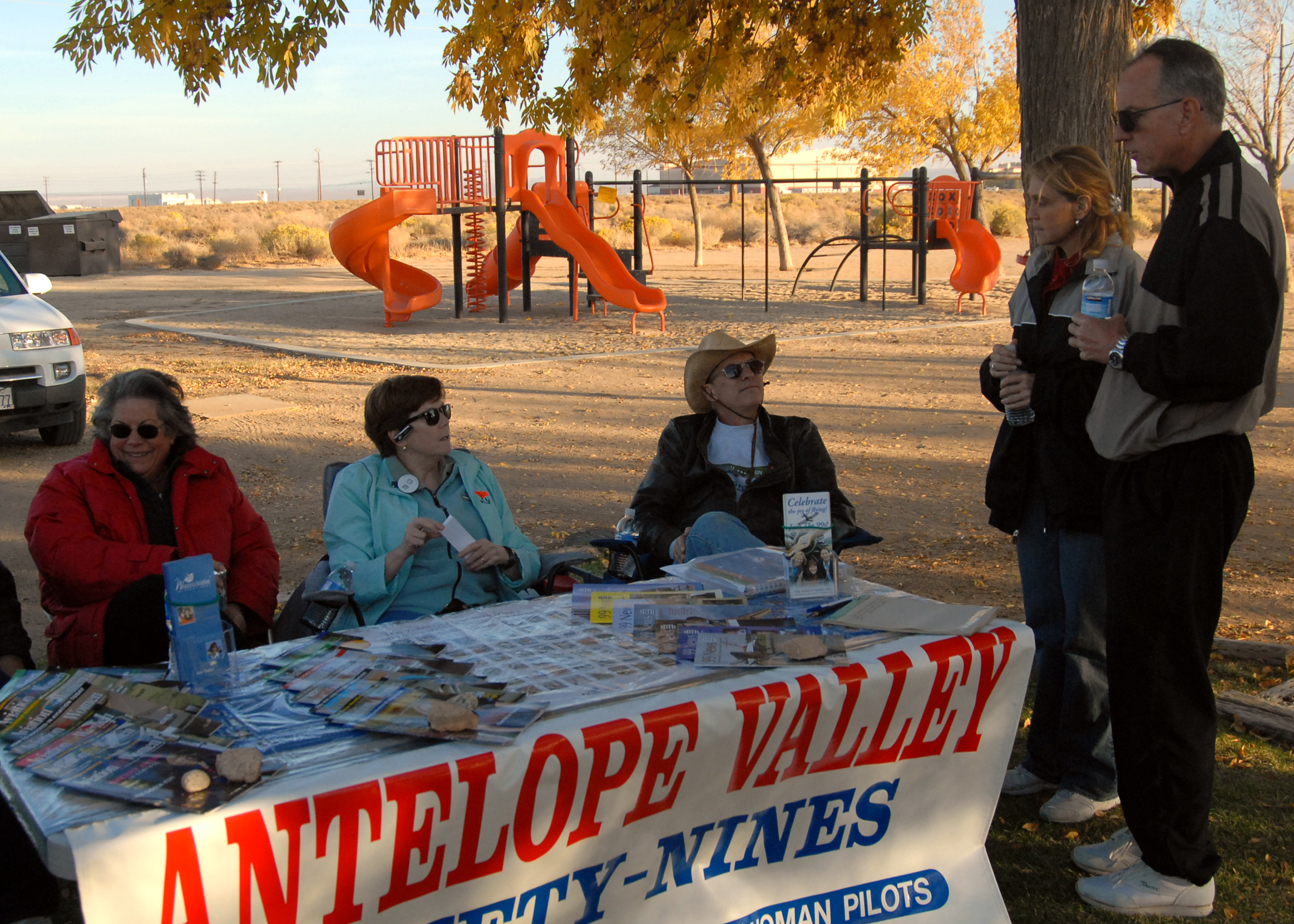
Members of the Ninety-Nines talk to attendees of Pancho Barnes Day November 7, 2009.

Along with depictions in The Right Stuff, the club was also immortalized in Lauren Kessler's biography of Barnes, The Happy Bottom Riding Club. Barnes' life was chronicled in a 2009 documentary film for PBS member station KOCE-TV, entitled The Legend of Pancho Barnes and the Happy Bottom Riding Club.

A made-for-TV movie aired on the CBS television network, Pancho Barnes (1988), starring Valerie Bertinelli, featured a fictionalized version of Barnes' life and events relating to The Happy Bottom Riding Club.

Chuck Yeager, who made a cameo appearance in The Right Stuff film as the bartender of the club, stated "if all the hours were ever totaled, I reckon I spent more time at her place than in a cockpit over those years."

Pancho's Happy Bottom Riding Club was listed on the Promenade directory as located in section 02-111 in the television series Star Trek: Deep Space Nine.

Air Force personnel from Edwards hold an annual barbecue on the site of the Happy Bottom Riding Club in remembrance of Barnes and the ranch. Visitors may still see the remains of the pool, the restaurant's foundation (including chimney), and the barn. From the air, an outline of the airstrip is visible.
