= Cathy Camper =

American artist, librarian, and author

- Born: 1956 (age 69–70); Madison, Wisconsin
- Occupations: Artist, librarian, and author
- Writing career
- Notable awards: Cybils Award (2016); Oregon Book Award (2020)
- Website: cathycamper.com

Cathy Camper (born in 1956, in Madison, Wisconsin) is an Arab-American artist, librarian and author of books for children and teens. She wrote Bugs Before Time, illustrated by Steve Kirk, and the graphic novel series Lowriders in Space, illustrated by Raúl the Third. She has also exhibited seed art, entering work in the Minnesota State Fair's Crop Art show starting in 1989. Her portrait of James Brown was featured in Simple Times: Crafts for Poor People by Amy Sedaris.

After receiving a degree in library sciences, Camper worked as a librarian at the Minneapolis Public Library until 2005, at which point she moved to Portland, Oregon.

== Awards and honors ==
Two of Camper's books are Junior Library Guild selections: Lowriders in Space (2015) and Ten Ways to Hear Snow (2021). Kirkus Reviews and The Washington Post named Lowriders in Space one of the best middle grade books of 2014, and The Bulletin of the Center for Children's Books named it one of the best graphic novels of 2015.

Awards for Camper's writing
Year	Title	Award	Result	Ref.
2015	Lowriders in Space	Américas Award	Commended	
2015	Lowriders in Space	ALSC Notable Children's Books	Selection	
2016	Lowriders to the Center of the Earth	Cybils Award for Elementary and Middle-Grade Graphic Novel	Winner	
2016	Lowriders to the Center of the Earth	VLA Graphic Novel Diversity Award for Youth	Winner	
2017	Lowriders to the Center of the Earth	ALSC Notable Children's Books	Selection	
2017	Lowriders to the Center of the Earth	Américas Award	Commended	
2020	Lowriders Blast from the Past	Oregon Book Award for Children's Literature	Winner	
2023	Lowriders to the Rescue	Golden Kite Award for Illustrated Book for Older Readers	Finalist	

== Publications ==
=== Standalone books ===
- Bugs Before Time: Prehistoric Insects and Their Relatives, illustrated by Steve Kirk (2002, Simon & Schuster Books for Young Readers, ISBN 9780689820922)
- Ten Ways to Hear Snow, illustrated by Kenard Pak (2020, Kokila, ISBN 9780399186332)
- Arab Arab All Year Long!, illustrated by Sawsan Chalabi (2022, Candlewick Press, ISBN 9781536213959)

=== Lowriders in Space series ===
The Lowriders in Space series is illustrated by Raúl the Third and published by Chronicle Books.

1. Lowriders in Space (2014, ISBN 9781452128696)
2. Lowriders to the Center of the Earth (2016, ISBN 9781452138367)
3. Lowriders Blast from the Past (2018, ISBN 9781452163154)
4. Lowriders to the Rescue (202, ISBN 9781452179490)
