= Tracy Daugherty =

American author

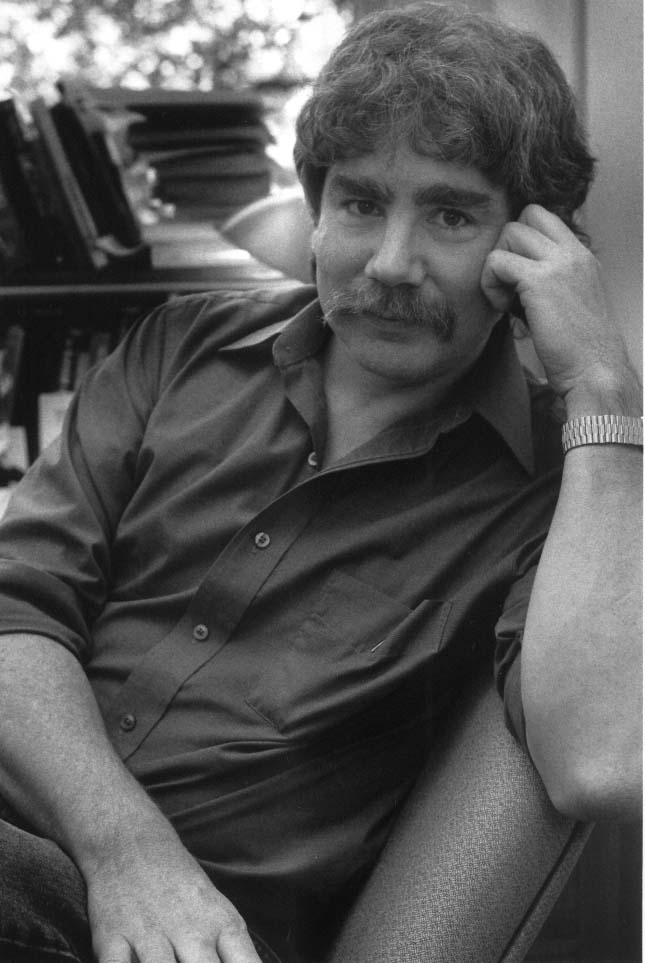
- Occupation: Author
- Writing career
- Notable awards: Oregon Book Award
- Website: tracydaugherty.com

Tracy Daugherty is an American author. He is Distinguished Professor of English and Creative Writing at Oregon State University. He has held fellowships from the Guggenheim Foundation and the National Endowment for the Arts.

Daugherty has written biographies of several important 20th century American writers. These include Hiding Man, about his former teacher, the short-story author and novelist Donald Barthelme; Just One Catch, about the novelist Joseph Heller; The Last Love Song, about the essayist and novelist Joan Didion; and Larry McMurtry: A Life, which was a finalist for the Pulitzer Prize in 2024.

Daugherty is a contributor to The New Yorker, McSweeney's, and The Georgia Review. His other published work includes the volumes What Falls Away (1996), which won the Oregon Book Award, and The Boy Orator. His first novel, Desire Provoked (1987) was acclaimed as "impressive" and "exquisitely accurate" by novelist Ron Loewinsohn in The New York Times.

== Bibliography ==
=== Fiction ===
==== Novels ====
- Desire Provoked (1986)
- What Falls Away (1996)
- The Boy Orator (1999)
- Axeman's Jazz (2003)

==== Story collections ====
- The Woman in the Oil Field (1996)
- It Takes a Worried Man (2002)
- Late in the Standoff (2005)
- One Day the Wind Changed (2010)
- The Empire of the Dead (2014)
- American Originals (2016)

=== Nonfiction ===
==== Biographies ====
- Hiding Man: A Biography of Donald Barthelme (2009)
- Just One Catch: A Biography of Joseph Heller (2011)
- The Last Love Song: A Biography of Joan Didion (2015)
- Leaving the Gay Place: Billy Lee Brammer and the Great Society (2018)
- Larry McMurtry: A Life (2023)
- Cormac McCarthy: A Legacy Revisited (October 2026)

==== Essays ====
- Five Shades of Shadow (2003)
- Let Us Build Us a City (2017)
