= Andrea Stolowitz =

American playwright and professor

- Education: University of California, San Diego; Columbia University; Barnard College; Hampshire College
- Occupation: Playwright
- Writing career
- Years active: 2004–
- Genres: Drama
- Notable awards: Oregon Book Award; Fowler/Levin New Play Prize
- Website: andreastolowitz.com

Andrea Stolowitz is an American playwright and university professor based in Portland, Oregon. She serves as the Ronni Lacroute Playwright in Residence at Artists Repertory Theatre, a five-year post begun in 2017. Her work has been produced nationally and internationally and she is a three time award winner of the Oregon Book Award for Drama.

== Career ==
In addition to her post with Artists Repertory Theatre, Stolowitz has been a longtime member of the writing collective Playwrights West, is an affiliated artist with English Theatre Berlin/International Performing Arts Center, core member with The Playwrights Center, and has been named a member of the New Dramatists class of 2024. An MFA playwriting alumna of University of California, San Diego, Stolowitz has taught at Willamette University, the University of Portland, and Duke University.

== Awards ==
In addition to critical reception, since 2009, Stolowitz has been the recipient of numerous artist and development grants from the North Carolina State Arts, the Sustainable Arts Foundation, the Oregon Arts Commission, and the Regional Arts and Culture Council.

- 2020 Blue Ink Playwriting Award for Recent Unsettling Events
- 2019 Oregon Book Award for Successful Strategies
- 2019 Women's Film, TV and Theatre Award with Portia Krieger
- 2015 Oregon Book Award for Ithaka
- 2014 DAAD Faculty Research Fellowship (Berlin, Germany)
- 2013 Oregon Book Award for Antarktikos
- 2013 Sitka Center for Arts and Ecology Fellowship
- 2012 Lorraine Hansberry Fellowship & Hedgebrook Writers Residency
- 2012 Literary Arts Drama Fellowship
- 2011 Fowler/Levin New Play Prize
- 2010 Soapstone Writers Award
- 2006 Ledig House International Writers’ Colony Fellowship
- 2005 Walter E. Dakin Playwriting Fellowship, Sewanee Writers' Conference

== Works ==
=== Full-length plays ===
- Recent Unsettling Events
- Antarktikos
- Berlin Diary
- Ithaka
- Knowing Cairo
- Recent Unsettling Events
- Successful Strategies
- Tales of Doomed Love

=== Devised plays ===
- Pep Talk
- Psychic Utopia
- Time, A Fair Hustler

=== One-act plays ===
- So I Was Driving Along
