= Ehud Havazelet =

American novelist and short story writer

- אהוד חבזלת
- Born: July 13, 1955; Jerusalem, Israel
- Died: November 5, 2015 (aged 60); Corvallis, Oregon, U.S.
- Occupation: Writer
- Writing career
- Genre: Literary fiction

Ehud Havazelet (Hebrew: אהוד חבזלת; July 13, 1955 – November 5, 2015) was an American novelist and short story writer.

Ehud Havazelet was born in Jerusalem, Israel. His father, Meir Havazelet, a rabbi and emeritus professor at Yeshiva University, emigrated to the United States in 1957. He graduated from Columbia University in 1977, and received an M.F.A at the University of Iowa Writers Workshop in 1984. He was a Wallace Stegner Fellow and Jones Lecturer at Stanford University from 1984 to 1989. He taught creative writing at Oregon State University from 1989 to 1999. He began teaching at the University of Oregon in 1999 and held the position of Professor of Creative Writing at the time of his death in 2015.

== Honors ==
- Pushcart Prize, 1988
- California Book Award, 1988
- Bay Area Book Reviewers Award, 1988
- Oregon Literary Arts Fellowship, 1990
- Oregon Literary Arts Fellowship, 1994
- Whiting Award, 1999
- Oregon Book Award for fiction, 1999
- Rockefeller Foundation Fellowship, 2000
- Guggenheim Fellowship, 2001
- Edward Lewis Wallant Award, 2007
- Oregon Book Award for fiction, 2008
- University of Oregon Fund for Faculty Excellence Award, 2008
- The Best American Short Stories 2011

== Works ==
=== Books ===
- What Is It Then Between Us? (short stories), Scribner, 1988.
- Like Never Before, (short stories), Farrar, Straus & Giroux, 1998.
- Bearing the Body, (novel), Farrar, Straus & Giroux, 2007.

=== Anthologies ===
- "Gurov in Manhattan". The Best American Short Stories 2011. Houghton Mifflin Harcourt. 2011. ISBN 978-0-547-24208-8. "best american short stories 2011."
  - (Originally published in TriQuarterly)

=== Short stories ===
- "Law of Return". Ploughshares. Emerson College. Winter 2007–2008.
