= Vanessa Veselka =

American novelist

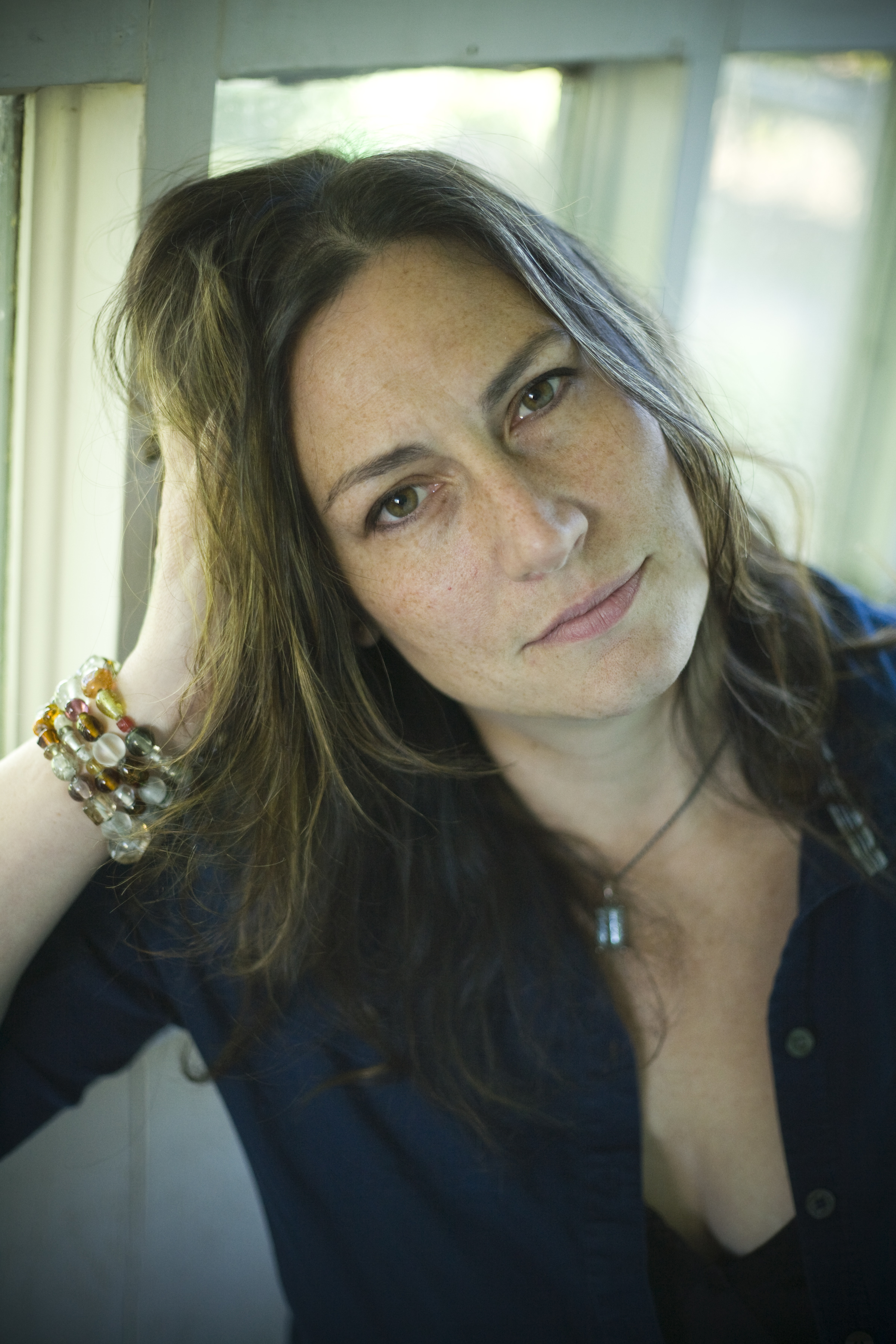
- Born: March 14, 1969 (age 57)
- Education: Reed College
- Occupation: Novelist
- Writing career
- Notable works: Zazen, The Great Offshore Grounds
- Website: vanessaveselka.com

Vanessa Veselka (born March 14, 1969) is an American writer best known for her 2020 novel The Great Offshore Grounds, which won the Oregon Book Award and was longlisted for the U.S. National Book Award. She is also known for her first novel, Zazen.

Her November 2012 GQ piece entitled "The Truck-Stop Killer" was included under the title "Highway of Lost Girls" in the 2013 edition of Best American Essays.

== Career ==
Her nonfiction has dealt with issues of women, violence and the road ("Green Screen," The Truck Stop Killer") as well as rape, mental health ("The Collapsible Woman") and unionization ("the Wake of Protest")("These Memory Care Workers Went on Strike to Save Lives). Her fiction frequently involves "Buddhist concerns" and geological themes.

Veselka's first novel Zazen was serialized online by Arthur Magazine, then published by Richard Nash's imprint Red Lemonade. The book grew out of a short story published by Tin House in 2010, and was nominated for a Ken Kesey Award for Fiction and awarded the $25,000 PEN/Bingham award "for a debut work of fiction that represents distinguished literary achievement and suggests great promise." Zazen was rereleased by Knopf in 2021.

Her second novel, The Great Offshore Grounds was released on August 25, 2020, from Knopf.

== Personal life ==
Veselka's bio says she has been "a teenage runaway, a sex-worker, a union organizer, and a student of paleontology." In the 1990s she played in the bands Bell and The Pinkos and ran a record label. She graduated from Reed College and lives in Portland, Oregon. She is the daughter of broadcaster Linda Ellerbee.

== Bibliography ==
- Veselka, Vanessa (2011). Zazen. Red Lemonade. ISBN 978-1-935869-05-4.
- Veselka, Vanessa (2020). The Great Offshore Grounds. Knopf. ISBN 978-0-525-65807-8.

== External links and references ==
- Vanessa Veselka's home page
