= Knox Summerour =

American trumpeter, vocalist, songwriter and composer

Knox Summerour is an Emmy-winning vocalist, trumpeter, songwriter, and composer with millions of streams worldwide. His voice and trumpet are featured throughout the hit Asian drama The First Half Of My Life.

In the Polybona Films/Paramount film remake of What Women Want starring Andy Lau and Gong Li, Knox performs two of his original songs (one co-written with Chinese-Australian film composer Christopher O'Young). His solo trumpet work is also featured in Ning Hao's hit film No Man's Land, as well as many Hollywood films and TV shows. He has worked with Kristen Bell, Jeff Dunham, Adam Sandler, Lin Yu Chun, and Wang Leehom. Knox and film composer Nathan Wang won an Emmy award for co-writing the music for Nick Spark's documentary film The Legend of Pancho Barnes.

Knox received a Bachelor of Music degree from Berklee College of Music in Boston, and a Master of Music degree from the University of Georgia where he was a protege of former Canadian Brass trumpeter Fred Mills.

== Discography ==
- 2011 - Today: Original Songs from the Paramount-Polybona Film "What Women Want" (EP)
- 2014 - The Christmas Trumpet, Volume 1
- 2017 - First Half of My Life: Songs from the Hit TV Series (我的前半生) (EP)
- 2020 - Hard Candy Christmas (Single)
- 2020 - The Neighborhood Trumpet: The Songs of Fred Rogers
- 2021 - Come Thou Fount of Every Blessing (Single)
- 2025 - Circumspect (upcoming)
