= Ralph Salisbury =

American poet

Ralph James Salisbury
- Born: January 24, 1926
- Died: October 9, 2017 (aged 91)
- Occupations: Poet, Writer, Editor, Professor
- Spouse: Ingrid Wendt
- Children: 3

Ralph James Salisbury (January 24, 1926 - October 9, 2017) was an American poet. His poem "In the Children's Museum in Nashville" was published in The New Yorker in 1960. His autobiography So Far, So Good won the 2012 River Teeth Literary Nonfiction Prize. His book Light from a Bullet Hole: Poems New and Selected was nominated for the Pulitzer Prize in 2009.

== Early life ==
Ralph Salisbury was born in 1926 in Fayette County in northeast Iowa to an Irish American mother and a father who had English, Cherokee, and Shawnee heritage, though he was not enrolled in any Native American nation. His parents raised him on a farm with no electricity or running water. He survived a lightning strike at the age of 15. A year after graduating from Aurora (Iowa) High School at age 16, he enlisted in the Air Force and was trained as an aerial gunman, completing his training within days of the end of World War II. The G.I Bill enabled him to enroll in the North Iowa Teachers College and, later, the University of Iowa, where he studied with Robert Lowell and earned an MFA degree.

== Awards ==
- C.E.S. Wood Retrospective Award (2015)
- River Teeth Literary Nonfiction Book Book Prize (2012)
- Rockefeller Bellagio Award in fiction (1992)
- Northwest Review Poetry Award
- Chapelbrook Award

== Bibliography ==
=== Autobiography ===
- So Far So Good, University of Nebraska Press, 2013 (River Teeth Literary Nonfiction Prize).

=== Published poetry collections ===
- Like the Sun in Storm, Habit of Rainy Nights Press, 2012 (nominated for the Oregon Book Award).
- Light from a Bullet Hole: Poems New and Selected, 1950-2008, Silverfish Review Press, 2009 (nominated for the Pulitzer Prize).
- Blind Pumper at the Well, Salt Publishing, Cambridge (UK), 2008.
- War in the Genes, Cherry Grove Editions, 2005.
- Rainbows of Stone, University of Arizona Press, September 2000.
- A White Rainbow, Poems of a Cherokee Heritage, Blue Cloud Press, 1985.
- Going to the Water: Poems of a Cherokee Heritage, Pacific House Books, 1983.
- Spirit Beast Chant, Blue Cloud Press, 1982.
- Pointing at the Rainbow, Blue Cloud Press, 1982.
- Ghost Grapefruit and Other Poems, Ithaca House, 1972.

=== Prose ===
- The Indian Who Bombed Berlin, stories, Michigan State University Press, 2009.
- The Last Rattlesnake Throw, stories, University of Oklahoma Press, 1998.
- One Indian and Two Chiefs, stories, Navajo Community College Press, 1993.

=== Translations ===
Poesie Da Un Retaggio Cherokee, Multimedia Edizioni, Salerno, Italy 1995, Tr. Prof. Fedora Giordano.

== Death ==
Salisbury died on October 9, 2017. He was survived by his wife, Ingrid Wendt, and three children: Jeffrey Salisbury, Brian Salisbury, and Martina Salisbury.
