= Susan Fletcher (American author) =

American novelist

- Born: May 28, 1951 (age 75); Pasadena, California, U.S.
- Occupation: Writer
- Writing career
- Genre: Speculative fiction
- Website: www.susanfletcher.com

Susan Fletcher (born May 28, 1951) is an American writer of fiction, primarily speculative fiction for children or young adults. She was born in Pasadena, California and has worked from Wilsonville, Oregon.

Her first book was The Haunting Possibility, a young adult mystery novel. Next came Dragon's Milk, a fantasy novel from Jean Karl Books at Atheneum in 1989. Three more Dragon Chronicles have followed, the latest in 2010.

== Works ==
- The Haunting Possibility (1988)
- Dragon Chronicles (Atheneum Books for Young Readers, 1989–2010)
  - Dragon's Milk (1989)
  - Flight of the Dragon Kyn (1993)
  - Sign of the Dove (1996)
  - Ancient, Strange, and Lovely (2010)
- The Stuttgart Nanny Mafia (Atheneum, 1991)
- Shadow Spinner (1998), illus. Dave Kramer, "re-telling of Shahrazad and the Tales of the Arabian Nights"
- Walk Across the Sea (2001)
- Alphabet of Dreams (2006)
- Dadblamed, Union Army Cow (Candlewick, 2007), picture book illustrated by Kimberly Bulcken Root
- Falcon in the Glass (2013)
- Journey of the Pale Bear (2018)
- A Bear Far from Home (2022)
- Sea Change (2025)

Shadow Spinner, Alphabet of Dreams, and Dragon's Milk have been published in German-language editions since 2002.
