= Vern Rutsala =

American poet

Vern Rutsala (February 5, 1934 – April 2, 2014) was an American poet. Born in McCall, Idaho, he was educated at Reed College (B.A.) and the Iowa Writers' Workshop (M.F.A.). He taught English and creative writing at Lewis & Clark College in Portland, Oregon for more than forty years, before retiring in 2004. He also taught for short periods at the University of Minnesota, Bowling Green State University, University of Redlands, and the University of Idaho, and served in the U.S. Army, 1956–58. He died in Oregon on April 2, 2014.

== Books ==
- The Window (1964)
- Small Songs: A Sequence, Stone Wall Press (1969)
- The Harmful State (1971)
- Laments (1975)
- The Journey Begins (1976)
- Paragraphs (1978)
- The New Life (1978)
- Walking Home from the Icehouse (1981)
- The Mystery of the Lost Shoes (1985)
- Backtracking (1985)
- Ruined Cities (1987)
- Selected Poems (1991)
- Little-known Sports (1994)
- The Moment's Equation (2004)
- A Handbook for Writers: New and Selected Prose Poems (2004)
- How We Spent Our Time (2006)
- The Long Haul (2015)

== Awards ==
- National Endowment for the Arts fellowships (1974, 1979)
- Northwest Poets Prize (1975)
- Guggenheim Fellowship (1982)
- Carolyn Kizer Poetry Prize (1988)
- Masters Fellowship from the Oregon Arts Commission (1990)
- Oregon Book Award (1992)
- Juniper Prize (1994)
- Richard Snyder Prize (2003)
- finalist, National Book Award for Poetry (2005)
