= Ingrid Wendt =

American poet

- Born: 1944 (age 81–82)
- Education: Cornell College, Iowa
- Spouse: Ralph Salisbury
- Writing career
- Language: English
- Genre: Poetry
- Notable awards: Yellowglen Award; Oregon Book Award

Ingrid Wendt (born 1944), is an American writer and poet.

== Personal life ==
Married to Ralph Salisbury, she lives in Eugene, Oregon.

== Education ==
Wendt graduated from Cornell College in Iowa in 1966, and she moved to Oregon that year.

== Awards ==
She has won both the Yellowglen Award and an Oregon Book Award.

== Works ==
- Wendt, Ingrid; Hedges, Elaine (1980). In her own image, women working in the arts. Old Westbury, New York, New York: The Feminist Press McGraw-Hill Book Co. ISBN 9780070204430.
- Wendt, Ingrid; Stafford, William (1980). Moving the house: poems. Brockport, New York: BOA Editions. ISBN 9780918526212.
- Wendt, Ingrid (1983). Starting with little things: a guide to writing poetry in the classroom. Salem, Or: Oregon Arts Foundation. ISBN 9780615120805.
- Wendt, Ingrid (1987). Singing the Mozart requiem. Portland, Oregon: Breitenbush Books. ISBN 9780932576521.
- Wendt, Ingrid; St John, Primus (1993). From here we speak: an anthology of Oregon poetry. Corvallis, Oregon: Oregon State University Press. ISBN 9780870713767.
- Wendt, Ingrid (2002). Blow the candle out: two poems. San Antonio, Texas: Pecan Grove Press. ISBN 9781931247061.
- Wendt, Ingrid (2004). The angle of sharpest ascending: poems. Cincinnati, Ohio: WordTech Editions. ISBN 9781932339048.
- Wendt, Ingrid (2005). Surgeonfish: poems. Cincinnati, Ohio: WordTech Editions. ISBN 9781933456065.
- Wendt, Ingrid (2011). Evensong. Kirksville, Missouri: Truman State University Press. ISBN 9781612480695.
