= George W. Aguilar =

American writer

George W. Aguilar, Sr. (born 1930) is a Wasco resident of the Warm Springs Indian Reservation who won the 2006 Oregon Book Award for Creative Nonfiction for When the River Ran Wild! Indian Traditions on the Mid-Columbia and the Warm Springs Reservation.

== Additional sources ==
- Oregon Voices: Telling the History of a Shattered Culture: An Interview with George W. Aguilar, Sr.
- Tribal Elder George Aguilar Sr. Is “First Count” in Oregon Census
- Kiksht Chinook elder tells about life as it was
