= Dreams Like Thunder =

1992 novel by Diane Simmons

- Author: Diane Simmons
- Language: English
- Publication date: 1992

Dreams Like Thunder is a 1992 novel written by Oregon author Diane Simmons. It won the Oregon Book Award for fiction in 1993. Its story takes place over a few days in summer 1959, on a farm in Eastern Oregon, and concerns a family visit by relatives who have been living in Japan. The protagonist is confronted with information about her grandfather, one of the valley's first settlers, massacring local Native Americans. A review in the Oregon Historical Quarterly described the grandmother as "the most vivid, complex, and vital character."
