= Justin Tussing =

American writer

Justin Tussing is an American writer. Tussing was a graduate of the University of Iowa's Writer's Workshop, where he held a Teaching/Writing Fellowship. He later became a Fellow at the Fine Arts Work Center in Provincetown, Massachusetts. His first published stories were "The Artificial Cloud," published in TriQuarterly (later reprinted in The Year's Best Fantasy and Horror: Fourteenth Annual Collection), and "The Tiny Man," published in Third Coast; both stories appeared in the spring of 2000.

In 2005, Tussing was selected, along with Uwem Akpan and Karen Russell, to appear in the New Yorker's annual Début Fiction issue. His first novel, The Best People in the World, was published in April 2006 and was awarded the 2006 Ken Kesey Award for the Novel.

From 2005-2007, Tussing taught English literature and creative writing at Lewis & Clark College in Portland, Oregon. Currently he is an associate professor of English and director of the Stonecoast MFA in Creative Writing at the University of Southern Maine.

His second novel, Vexation Lullaby, will be published April 12, 2016.

== Books ==
- The Best People in the World (2006)
- Vexation Lullaby (2016)
