= Kimberly King Parsons =

American writer

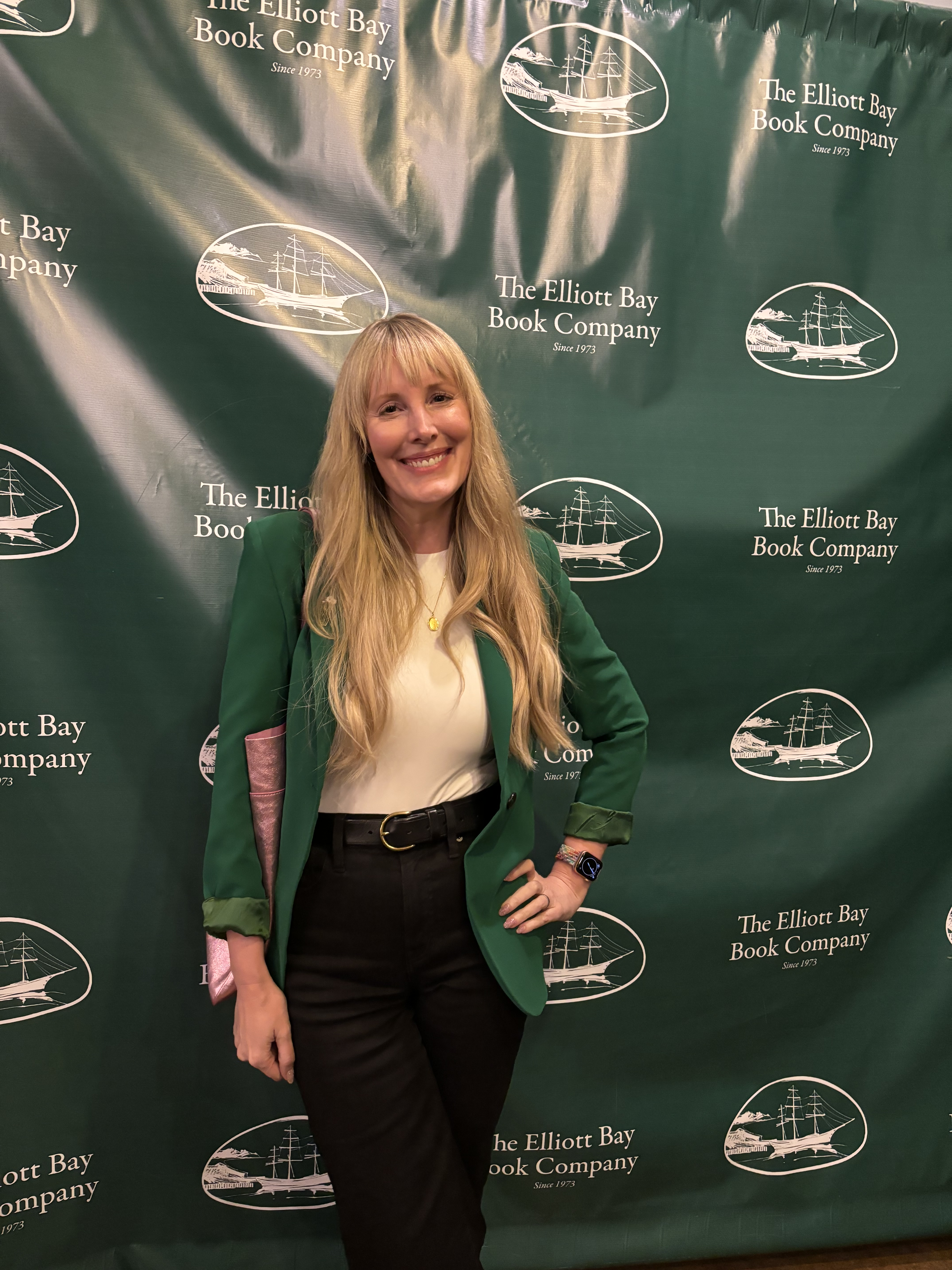
- Kimberly King Parsons at Elliott Bay Book Company in 2024
- Born: Texas, U.S.
- Education: Columbia University
- Occupations: Novelist, short story author
- Website: www.kimberlykingparsons.com

Kimberly King Parsons is an American author and educator. She is the author of the short story collection Black Light (2019), which was longlisted for the National Book Award and the Story Prize, and the novel We Were the Universe (2024), which won the Ken Kesey Award for Fiction at the Oregon Book Awards and was ranked number two on TIME Magazine's Best Books of 2024.

== Early life and education ==
Parsons was born in Lubbock, Texas. She received her MFA from Columbia University, where she served as editor-in-chief of Columbia: A Journal of Literature and Art.

== Career ==
=== Black Light ===
Parsons's debut collection, Black Light, was published by Vintage Books in August 2019. In 2019, Black Light was longlisted for the National Book Award and the Story Prize. In NPR, Michael Schaub called it "a wild and compassionate debut collection," praising Parsons for writing "with the unpredictable power of a firecracker" and for proving herself "a gutsy country-punk poet with a keen eye and a stubbornly unique sensibility." In the Los Angeles Times, Nathan Deuel wrote that the collection was "a book for the lonely, for the losers poised for more—it's a celebration of and a deeply felt meditation on the injustice, cruelty and a million private horrors endured by the weak and the unloved."

=== We Were the Universe ===
Parsons's debut novel, We Were the Universe, was published by Alfred A. Knopf in 2024. The novel was selected as a Dakota Johnson Book Club pick and ranked number two on TIME Magazine's Best Books of 2024. In the New York Times Book Review, Alissa Nutting praised the novel's emotional depth and narrative structure, describing it as entertaining and singular in its approach. Nutting noted that "Parsons has gifted us with a profound, gutsy tale of grief's dismantling power."

In 2025, We Were the Universe won the Ken Kesey Award for Fiction at the Oregon Book Awards. The novel was also a finalist for the 37th Annual Lambda Literary Award for Bisexual Fiction.

== Awards ==
Year	Work	Award	Category	Result	Ref
2019	Black Light	National Book Award for Fiction	Fiction	Longlisted	
2019	Black Light	Story Prize	Short Story Collection	Longlisted	
2020	Black Light	Edmund White Award	Debut Fiction	Shortlisted	
2020	Black Light	Oregon Book Awards	Fiction	Shortlisted	
2020	Black Light	Texas Institute of Letters Awards	Best First Fiction	Shortlisted	
2020	"Foxes"	National Magazine Award	Fiction	Won	
2024–2025	We Were the Universe	Ken Kesey Oregon Book Award	Fiction	Won	
2024–2025	We Were the Universe	Pacific Northwest Booksellers Award	Fiction	Shortlisted	
2024–2025	We Were the Universe	Lambda Literary Award	Bisexual Fiction	Shortlisted	
2024–2025	We Were the Universe	Premio Letterario The Bridge	American Fiction	Shortlisted	
2024–2025	We Were the Universe	Writers League of Texas Book Award	Fiction	Shortlisted	
2024–2025	We Were the Universe	Joyce Carol Oates Prize	Fiction	Longlisted	

== Other work and awards ==
In 2020, Parsons received the National Magazine Award for Fiction for her story "Foxes," which was published in The Paris Review. Her fiction has been published in The Paris Review, Best Small Fictions 2017, Black Warrior Review, No Tokens, Ninth Letter, and The Kenyon Review.

== Teaching ==
Parsons teaches fiction in the MFA Writing Program at Pacific University in Oregon.

== Personal life ==
Parsons lives in Portland, Oregon.

== Bibliography ==
=== Collections ===
- Black Light (2019)

=== Novels ===
- We Were the Universe (2024)
