= Sara Ryan =

American writer

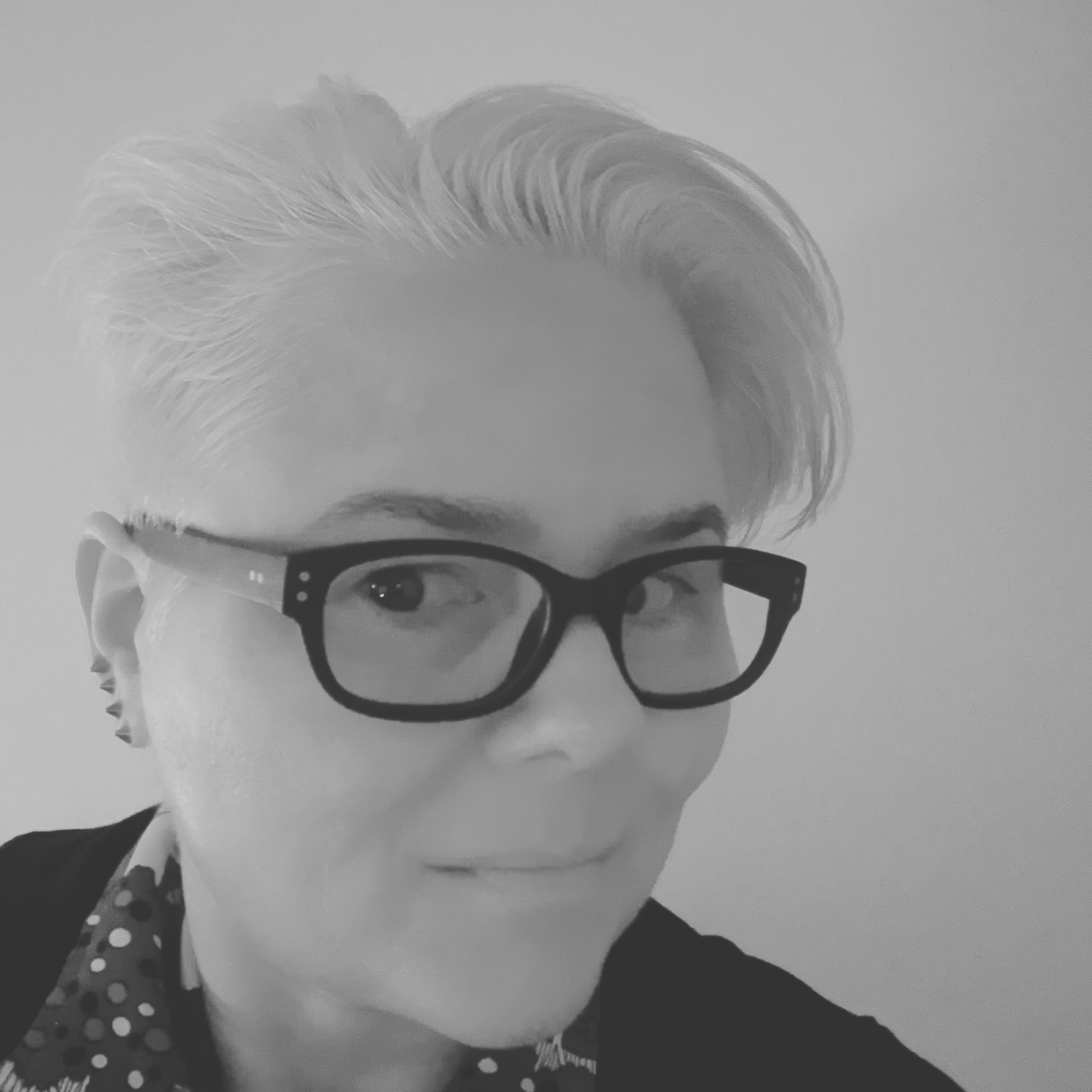
- Ryan in 2019
- Born: November 13, 1971 (age 54); Ohio, United States
- Occupations: Author; librarian; lecturer
- Partner: Steve Lieber
- Writing career
- Language: English
- Genre: Young Adult
- Notable awards: Leslie Bradshaw Award for Young Adult Literature
- Website: www.sararyan.com

Sara Ryan (born November 13, 1971) is an American writer and librarian living in Portland, Oregon.

== Biography ==
Ryan was raised in Ann Arbor, Michigan, where they graduated from Pioneer High School in 1989. Their first novel, Empress of the World, was published in 2001 and is an ALA Best Book for Young Adults. A sequel, The Rules for Hearts, was published in 2007 and won the 2008 Oregon Book Award for Young Adult Literature. Ryan also writes graphic novels. Together with Carla Speed McNeil, they released Bad Houses in 2013 from Dark Horse Comics.

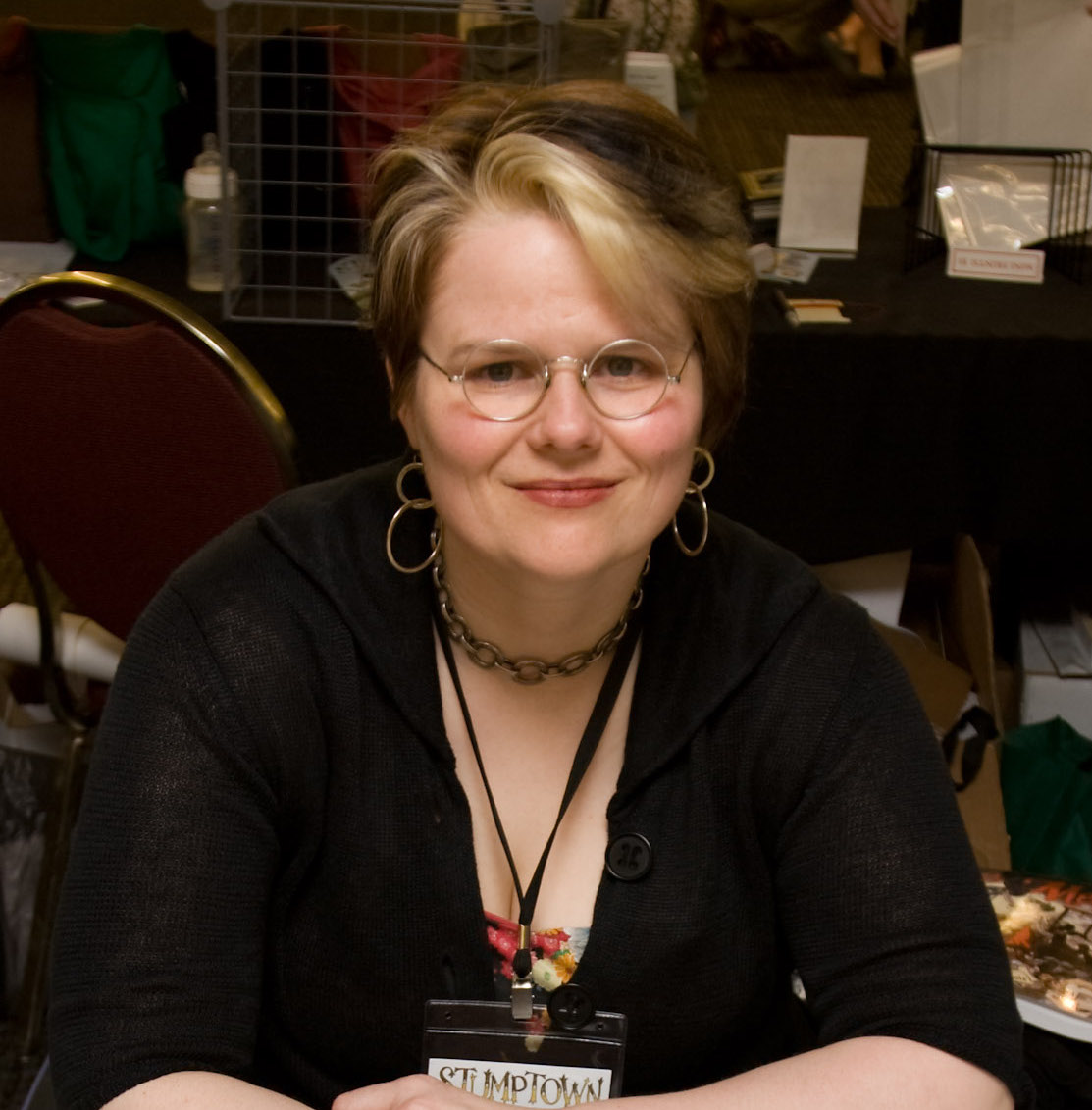
Sara Ryan at Stumptown Comics Fest 2009

Ryan is a member of the faculty at the Vermont College of Fine Arts.

Ryan is openly bisexual, they are married to the cartoonist Steve Lieber.

== Bibliography ==
=== Novels ===
- Empress of the World (2001)
- The Rules for Hearts (2007)
- Mountain Upside Down (2025)

=== Graphic novels and sequential art ===
- Me and Edith Head (art: Steve Lieber) in Cicada v.4 no. 1 (Carus Publishing), 2002
  - Nominated for a 2002 Eisner Award for Best Short Story
  - reprinted as a standalone, self-published volume, 2002
- "Family Story" (art: Steve Lieber and Jeff Parker) in Hellboy: Weird Tales #3, 2003
  - Collected in Hellboy: Weird Tales 1 (ISBN 1-56971-622-6, Dark Horse), 2003
- Flytrap (series)
  - Flytrap – Episode One: Juggling Act (art: Steve Lieber), 2005
  - Flytrap – Episode Two: Deep, too (art: Ron Chan), 2007
  - Flytrap – Episode Three: Over the Wall (art: Ron Chan), 2007
  - Flytrap – Episode Four: Performance Anxiety (art: Sarah Burrini), 2009
- Click (art: Dylan Meconis), 2007
- Einbahnstrasse Waltz (art: Cat Ellis), 2007
- Bad Houses (art: Carla Speed McNeil), 2013
