= The Wicked Deep =

2018 novel by Shea Ernshaw

- First edition
- Author: Shea Ernshaw
- Cover artist: Lisa Perrin
- Language: English
- Genre: Young adult fiction
- Publisher: Simon & Schuster
- Publication date: 2018-03-06
- Publication place: US
- Media type: print
- Pages: 320
- Awards: Oregon Book Award
- ISBN: 978-1-4814-9734-3
- Website: https://www.sheaernshaw.com/books/the-wicked-deep/

The Wicked Deep is the debut novel from American young adult author Shea Ernshaw. The screen rights were acquired by Netflix in 2018. The Wicked Deep was published in 2018 by Simon Pulse, an imprint of Simon & Schuster. The novel was on the New York Times Best Seller list of March 25, 2018 in the Young Adult Hardcover category in the seventh spot. The Wicked Deep won the 2019 Leslie Bradshaw Award for Young Adult Fiction, a subcategory of the Oregon Book Award.

== Plot ==
Set in the small town of Sparrow, Oregon, the novel follows seventeen-year-old Penny Tabolt, who knows all about the curse that torments the town: about the Swan sisters who were accused of witchcraft and drown nearly two centuries ago. She knows why the sisters return each summer, why they seek revenge upon the men of the town, and how to stop them. But this summer, a boy, Bo Carter, comes to town, and he has as many secrets as Penny, and soon she must decide who to save: Bo, or herself.

== Reception ==
Kirkus Reviews said that "readers will drown in this finely crafted, atmospheric book" but noted that not all readers may like how quickly the main characters fall in love. Publishers Weekly stated "balancing delicate emotion and authentic suspense, the hypnotic prose pulls readers into the question of how, or if, the curse of the sisters can be broken" and that while perceptive readers may be able to predict how the story will progress, Ernshaw created "an intriguing reality in which the supernatural coexists with the mundane elements of small-town life".
