= Pancho Barnes (film) =

- Promotional poster
- Genre: Historical drama Biography; Adventure
- Written by: John Michael Hayes
- Story by: David Crisholm; John Michael Hayes
- Directed by: Richard T. Heffron
- Starring: Valerie Bertinelli; Ted Wass; James Stephens; Cynthia Harris
- Music by: Allyn Ferguson
- Country of origin: United States
- Original language: English

Production
- Producers: Blu André; Alice Pardo
- Production locations: Hartlee Field Airport, Denton, Texas; Dallas; Forney, Texas; Fort Worth, Texas; Houston, Texas; Galveston, Texas
- Cinematography: William Wages
- Editors: Michael F. Anderson; Michael Eliot
- Running time: 150 minutes
- Production company: Orion Television

Original release
- Network: CBS
- Release: October 25, 1988

Pancho Barnes is a 1988 American made-for-television biographical film about the pioneering female aviator, starring Valerie Bertinelli, Ted Wass, James Stephens and Cynthia Harris. The film was directed by Richard T. Heffron and premiered on CBS on October 25, 1988.

== Plot ==
Leaving an arranged marriage to Reverend Rankin Barnes (James Stephens), Florence Lowe "Pancho" Barnes (Bertinelli) takes an interest in flying light planes in the 1920s, and soon rivals Amelia Earhart (Nance Williamson), breaking world speed records.

Barnes is hired by Howard Hughes (David Kockinis) to do stunt flying for the film Hell's Angels, instigates the formation of the Associated Motion Picture Pilots, was a World War II Air Force Civilian Pilot Trainer, and establishes the Happy Bottom Riding Club as a mess hall for pilots and former servicemen.

== Cast ==
- Valerie Bertinelli as Pancho Barnes
- Ted Wass as Frank Clarke
- James Stephens as Rankin Barnes
- Cynthia Harris as Mrs. Lowe
- Geoffrey Lewis as Ben Catlin
- Todd Allen as Chuck Yeager

== Reception ==
Don Shirley of the Los Angeles Times was critical, saying the film sanitized Barnes' life and persona.

=== Awards ===
At the 1989 Emmys, Pancho Barnes won Outstanding Achievement in Costuming for A Miniseries or A Special and was nominated for Outstanding Achievement in Music Composition for A Miniseries or A Special.

== See also ==
- The Legend of Pancho Barnes and the Happy Bottom Riding Club, 2009 documentary
