= Burt Kimmelman =

American poet and scholar (born 1947)

- Born: Burt Joseph Kimmelman; May 5, 1947 (age 78) New York City, U.S.
- Occupation: Poet, scholar
- Education: State University of New York at Cortland (BA); City University of New York (MA, PhD)
- Spouse: Diane Simmons
- Children: 1

Burt Joseph Kimmelman (born May 5, 1947) is an American poet and scholar.

== Life and work ==
Born and raised in New York City after World War Two, Burt Kimmelman has published eleven collections of poetry. His poetry is often anthologized and was featured on The Writer's Almanac radio program.

He is also the author of two book-length literary studies: The "Winter Mind": William Bronk and American Letters (1998) and The Poetics of Authorship in the Later Middle Ages: The Emergence of the Modern Literary Persona (1996).

He is a distinguished professor of Humanities at New Jersey Institute of Technology in Newark, New Jersey where he teaches literary and cultural studies.

His academic interests include modern and postmodern American poetry and the development of the poetics of authorship in medieval Europe. As a poet, he works within the tradition of William Carlos Williams.

Kimmelman received a PhD in English Literature from the City University of New York; a certificate in interdisciplinary medieval studies from the City University of New York; a M.A. in English Literature from Hunter College, City University of New York; and a B.A. in English Literature from the State University of New York at Cortland. He is married to the writer Diane Simmons.

== Works ==
=== Poetry collections ===
- A Door, a Window: New Poems, East Rockaway, NY: Marsh Hawk Press (2025)
- Steeple at Sunrise: New Poems, East Rockaway, NY: Marsh Hawk Press (2022)
- Wings Apart, Loveland, OH: Dos Madres Press (2019)
- Abandoned Angel: New Poems, East Rockaway, NY: Marsh Hawk Press (2016)
- Gradually the World: New and Selected Poems 1982 - 2013, Buffalo, NY: BlazeVOX Books (2013)
- The Way We Live, Loveland, OH: Dos Madres Press (2011)
- As If Free, Jersey City, NJ: Talisman House, Publishers (2009)
- There Are Words, Loveland, OH: Dos Madres Press (2007)
- Somehow, East Rockaway, New York: Marsh Hawk Press (2005)
- The Pond at Cape May Point (a collaboration of poems and paintings by Fred Caruso), New York City: Marsh Hawk Press (2002)
- First Life, Jersey City, NJ: Jensen/Daniels, Publishers (2000)
- Musaics, New York: Spuyten Duyvil (1992)

=== Critical studies ===
- Zero Point Poiesis: George Quasha's Axial Art, Ed., Intr. New York: Aporeia (2022)
- Visible at Dusk: Selected Essays. Loveland, OH (2021)
- Light abstracts the smallest things: The Aesthetics of Basil King, Ed., Northfield, MA: Talisman House, Publishers (2020)
- Machaut's Legacy: The Judgment Poetry Tradition in Late Medieval Literature, Co-Ed. with R. Barton Palmer, Pref. R. Barton Palmer, Intr. Burt Kimmelman, Gainesville: University Press of Florida (2017)
- Encyclopedia of American Poetry, Co-Ed. with Temple Cone, and Randall Huff, New York: Cengage / Facts on File (2013, 2016)
- The Poetry and Poetics of Michael Heller: A Nomad Memory, Co-Ed. with Jon Curley and For., Madison, New Jersey: Fairleigh Dickinson University Press / Rowman & Littlefield (2015)
- William Bronk in the Twenty-First Century: New Assessments, Co-Ed. with Edward Foster, Greenfield, MA: Talisman House, Publishers (2013)
- The Facts on File Companion to American Poetry, Co-Ed. with Randall Huff, and Temple Cone, New York: Facts on File (2007)
- The Facts on File Companion to 20th-Century American Poetry, Ed., Intr., and Append., New York: Facts on File, Inc. (2005)
- The "Winter Mind": William Bronk and American Letters, Madison, New Jersey: Fairleigh Dickinson University Press / London: Associated University Presses (1998)
- The Poetics of Authorship in the Later Middle Ages: The Emergence of the Modern Literary Persona, New York: Peter Lang Publishing (1996)
