= The Great Offshore Grounds =

Book by Vanessa Veselka

- Author: Vanessa Veselka
- Language: English
- Genre: Novel
- Publisher: Knopf Publishing Group
- Publication date: August 25, 2020
- Publication place: United States
- Media type: Print
- Pages: 448
- ISBN: 9780525658078

The Great Offshore Grounds is an American novel, by Vanessa Veselka. It won the Oregon Book Award and was longlisted for the U.S. National Book Award.

== On the novel ==
The novel is post-capitalist fiction.
