= Empress of the World =

Book by Sara Ryan

- Author: Sara Ryan
- Language: English
- Genre: Young adult novel
- Publisher: Penguin Books
- Publication date: 2001
- Publication place: United States
- Media type: Print (Paperback)
- Pages: 213 pp
- ISBN: 0-670-89688-8
- OCLC: 45532410
- LC Class: PZ7.R957 Em 2001
- Followed by: The Rules for Hearts

Empress of the World is a young adult novel by Sara Ryan. It was published in 2001. Its sequel, The Rules for Hearts, was published in April 2007. It won the 2002 Oregon Book Award for Young Readers Literature.

Ryan summarizes the book conceptually as "Friendship, love, and the sometimes blurry lines between the two."

Empress of the World tells the story of Nicola, a teenage girl who attends a summer program for gifted children, where she falls in love with a girl named Battle.
