= Diane Simmons =

American author (born 1948)

- Born: 1948 (age 77–78); Eastern Oregon, U.S.
- Education: University of Oregon; City College of New York (MA); City University of New York (PhD)
- Occupation: Author
- Spouse: Burt Kimmelman
- Children: 1
- Writing career
- Notable awards: Oregon Book Award (1993)
- Website: www.dianesimmonswrites.com

Diane Simmons (born 1948) is an American author. She won the Oregon Book Award in for her novel Dreams Like Thunder, and the Ohio State University Prize in Short Fiction for Little America. She teaches English at the Borough of Manhattan Community College of the City University of New York (CUNY). She published a biography of Caribbean author Jamaica Kincaid, which was based on her doctoral dissertation at the City University of New York.

Her first novel was published in 1980, and she has since published seven book-length works of fiction, non-fiction and criticism, as well as many pieces of short fiction, short non-fiction and literary criticism. Her most recent book, The Courtship of Eva Eldridge a work of reported literary nonfiction, was published by University of Iowa Press in 2016. She has held fellowships at the MacDowell Colony and also served as a Fulbright Fellow to the Czech Republic. She holds an MA in creative writing and a PhD in American Literature.

== Early life and education ==
Simmons was born and grew up in the high desert country of Eastern Oregon; her family worked a farm taken up by her pioneer great-grandfather who came west from Kentucky on the Oregon Trail. Simmons depicted the life in this remote farm and ranch community in her novel Dreams Like Thunder (1992).

She was valedictorian of her high school, and attended the University of Oregon Robert D Clark Honors College on full scholarship. During her college years, she traveled to Holland where she worked in a youth hotel, to France, Spain and Morocco, and to London where she worked as an au pair. She also worked as an au pair in Paris.

At the University of Oregon, she majored in European history, graduating Phi Beta Kappa.

For the next decade, she travelled the United States, Mexico and Central America. Her first published piece was an article in Mother Earth News giving instructions on how to live in VW bus. Returning at times to the West, she took up work as a newspaper reporter on various newspapers including the crusading, liberal Intermountain Observers in Boise, where she won the Idaho Press Club Prize for Investigative Reporting after going undercover to reveal a nationwide Ponzi scheme. She also worked as a reporter and editor for the daily Alaska News Miner and the Seattle Post Intelligencer.

In 1980, she published the suspense novel, Let the Bastards Freeze in the Dark, in which environmental terrorists in Fairbanks, Alaska attempt to battle the oil pipeline.

In 1981, she moved to New York City, where she earned an MA in creative writing from City College of New York and a PhD in English literature from the Graduate Center of the City University of New York. At City College, she served as an editor on Fiction Magazine.

== Teaching ==
In the 1990s, she became a professor of writing and literature at City University of New York where she continues. In her early years at CUNY, she wrote several scholarly books: Jamaica Kincaid, Maxine Hong Kingston, and The Narcissism of Empire. She also published numerous academic essays and articles.

== Publications ==
In the late '80s, she published her first short story, "Where We Are Buried," in Northwest Review, and her second novel, Dreams Like Thunder, writing the book in one month at the McDowell Colony. Both the story and the novel explore the end of the frontier in the Mountain West, was the winner of the Oregon Book Award and named "New and Notable" by The New York Times.

In the mid-2000s, she began to publish short stories, many of them based on her earlier travels in Mexico, Central America and the West. Many of these stories were collected in the volume, Little America, winner of the Ohio University Prize for Short Fiction.

In 2016 she published the non-fiction book, The Courtship of Eva Eldridge, based on some 800 letters found in an eastern Oregon attic. The book, the product of five years of research, follows the story of a young farm girl whose life is tragically altered by her time in shipyards on the Oregon Coast.

In 2018, Simmons served as a Fulbright Fellow in the Czech Republic where she taught American literature and literary journalism at Pardubice University. While in the Czech Republic, her essay, "Anywhere from Somewhere", which discusses the position of an Eastern "elite" who comes from Trump country, was published in Czech translation in the magazine Host. Upon returning, she wrote her essay, "Nobody Goes to the Gulag Anymore", considers post-totalitarian Czech life.

== Views ==
Simmons has been an ardent opponent of Donald Trump and Trumpism and climate activist. In 2018, she—and hundreds of other volunteers—successfully worked to flip a Congressional district in New Jersey. In 2020 she is working with Vote Forward and Reclaim Our Vote to get out swing state vote.

As a climate activist, and in 2019 she was arrested along with 70 other Climate Extinction activists for lying down on 8th Avenue in Manhattan. The protest, in front of The New York Times, called on the newspaper to take a more urgent tone in climate reporting.

As a member of PEN American Center Prison Writing Committee, she judges a non-fiction contest of inmate writing.

== Awards and honors ==
Dejur Award in Fiction, City College, City University of New York (1986).

Wolfe Award in Fiction, City College, City University of New York (1985).

Artist-in-Residence Fellowships, The MacDowell Colony (1985, 1988).

Artist-Residence Fellowship, Cummington Community for the Arts, (1988).

Ph.D. Orals, City University of New York- Graduate Center, passed with honors (1990).

Winner, the Oregon Book Award for Fiction (1993).

The Melvin Dixon Award for Best Dissertation on African-American Literature (1994).

Nominated, Pushcart Prize for "Fareast Logistics," a short story, (1994).

Winner Heinz Kohut Prize, presented by Kohut Memorial Fund for the paper." April (2002).

Subject of biographical article in Contemporary Authors. Gale Group (2004).

Winner, Ohio State University Prize for Short Fiction, (2011).

Runner-up, Missouri Review Editor's Prize, (2010).

Subject of feature (with other writers) "Winners on Winning" in Poets and Writers," (2016).

Listed in the Directory of American Poets and Fiction Writers.

Listed, Directory of American Scholars, 11th edition.

== Personal life ==
Simmons is married to Burt Kimmelman, a widely published poet, editor and founder of Marshhawk Press, and Distinguished Professor of Humanities at New Jersey Institute of Technology. She has one daughter, Jane Z. Kimmelman.
