= Pancho Barnes =

American aviator (1901–1975)

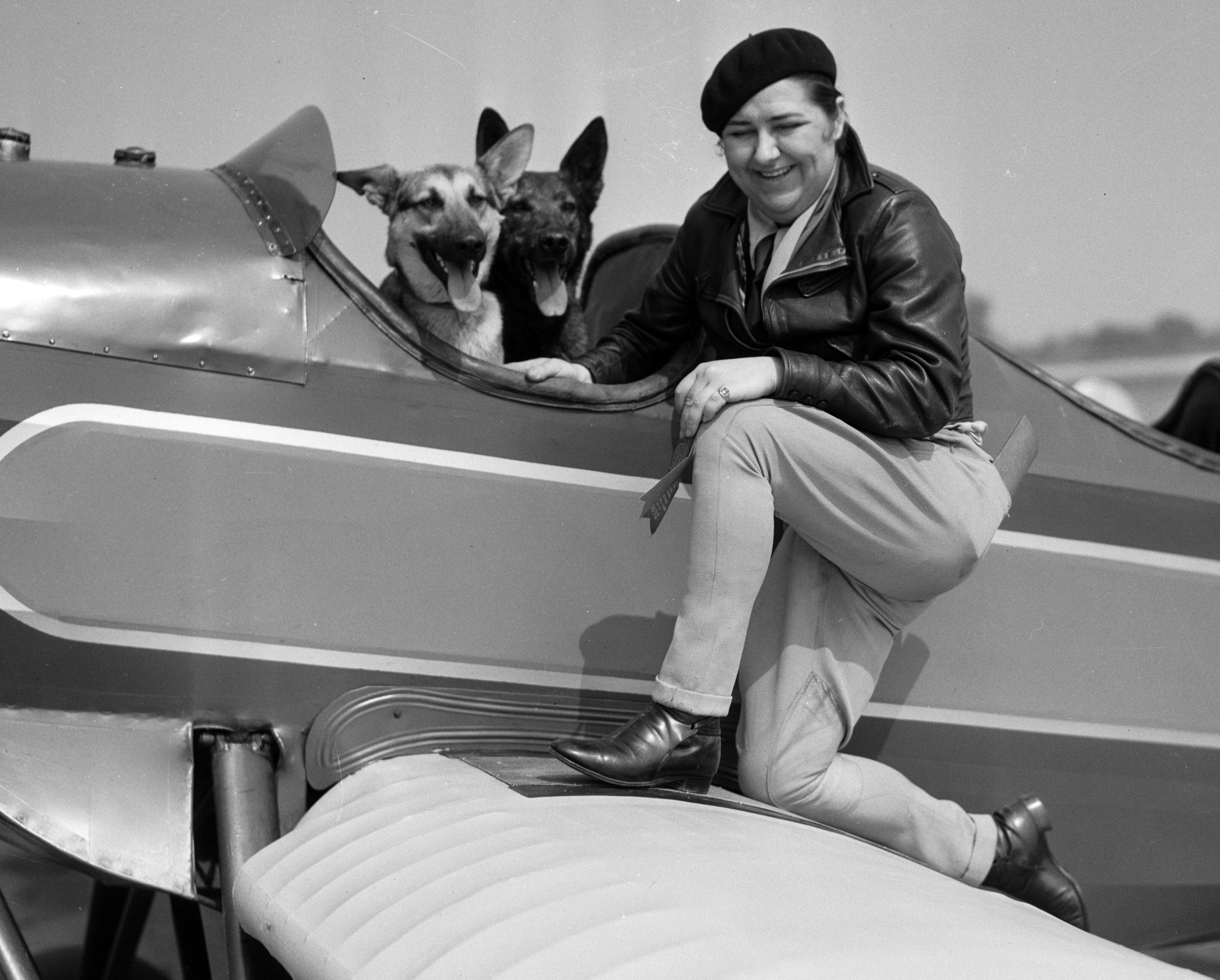
- Barnes in 1931
- Born: Florence Leontine Lowe; July 22, 1901; Pasadena, California, US
- Died: March 30, 1975 (aged 73); Boron, California, US
- Other name: Pancho
- Known for: Racing pilot, Proprietor
- Spouses: Reverend C. Rankin Barnes; Robert Hudson Nichols, Jr.; Don Shalita
- Children: 1

Florence Lowe "Pancho" Barnes (July 22, 1901 – March 30, 1975) was a pioneer aviator and a founder of the first movie stunt pilots' union. In 1930, she broke Amelia Earhart's air speed record. Barnes raced in the Women's Air Derby and was a member of the Ninety-Nines. In later years, she was known as the owner of the Happy Bottom Riding Club, a bar and restaurant in the Mojave Desert, Southern California, catering to the legendary test pilots and aviators who worked nearby.

== Early years ==
She was born as Florence Leontine Lowe on July 22, 1901, to Thaddeus Lowe II (1870–1955) and his first wife, Florence May Dobbins, in Pasadena, California. She was born to a wealthy family, growing up in a large mansion in San Marino, California. During her formative years, she attended the area's finest private schools, such as The Bishop's School. Her father, an avid sportsman, encouraged her to appreciate the great outdoors, and Florence became an accomplished equestrian. Her grandfather was Thaddeus S. C. Lowe, who had pioneered American aviation with the establishment of the nation's first military air unit, the Army of the Potomac's balloon corps during the American Civil War. He took his granddaughter to an air show when she was 10 years old.

In 1919, Florence married Reverend C. Rankin Barnes of South Pasadena, California, and they had a son, William E. Barnes. Her mother died in 1924.

== Aviation career ==
Having spent four months abroad in Mexico, getting caught up with revolutionaries and escaping the attention of authorities while disguised as a man, in 1928 she began to use the nickname "Pancho". Barnes returned to San Marino, California, with an inheritance bequeathed to her on her parents' death. In 1928, while driving her cousin Dean Banks to flying lessons, she decided to learn to fly, and convinced her cousin's flight instructor, Ben Catlin, a World War I veteran, of her desire that same day. She soloed after six hours of formal instruction.

Barnes ran an ad-hoc barnstorming show and competed in air races. Despite a crash in the 1929 Women's Air Derby, she returned in 1930 under the sponsorship of the Union Oil Company to win the race – and break Amelia Earhart's world women's speed record with a speed of 196.19 miles per hour (315.74 km/h). Barnes broke this record in a Travel Air Type R Mystery Ship.

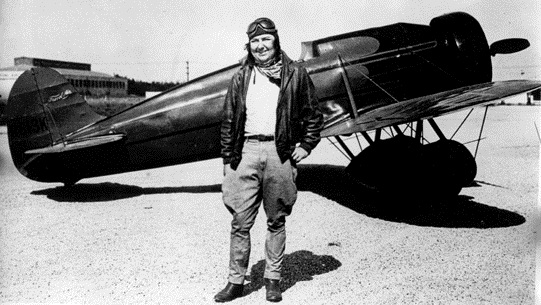
Pancho Barnes with Travel Air Type R Mystery Ship R613K, c. 1930s

After breaking the record, a reporter asked her how it felt. Her response was typical of her personality: "I feel like a sex addict in a whore house with a pocket full of $100 bills!"

After her contract with Union Oil expired, Barnes moved to Hollywood to work as a stunt pilot for movies. In 1931, she started the Associated Motion Picture Pilots, a union of film industry stunt fliers which promoted flying safety and standardized pay for aerial stunt work. She flew in several air-adventure movies of the 1930s, including Howard Hughes' Hell's Angels (1930).

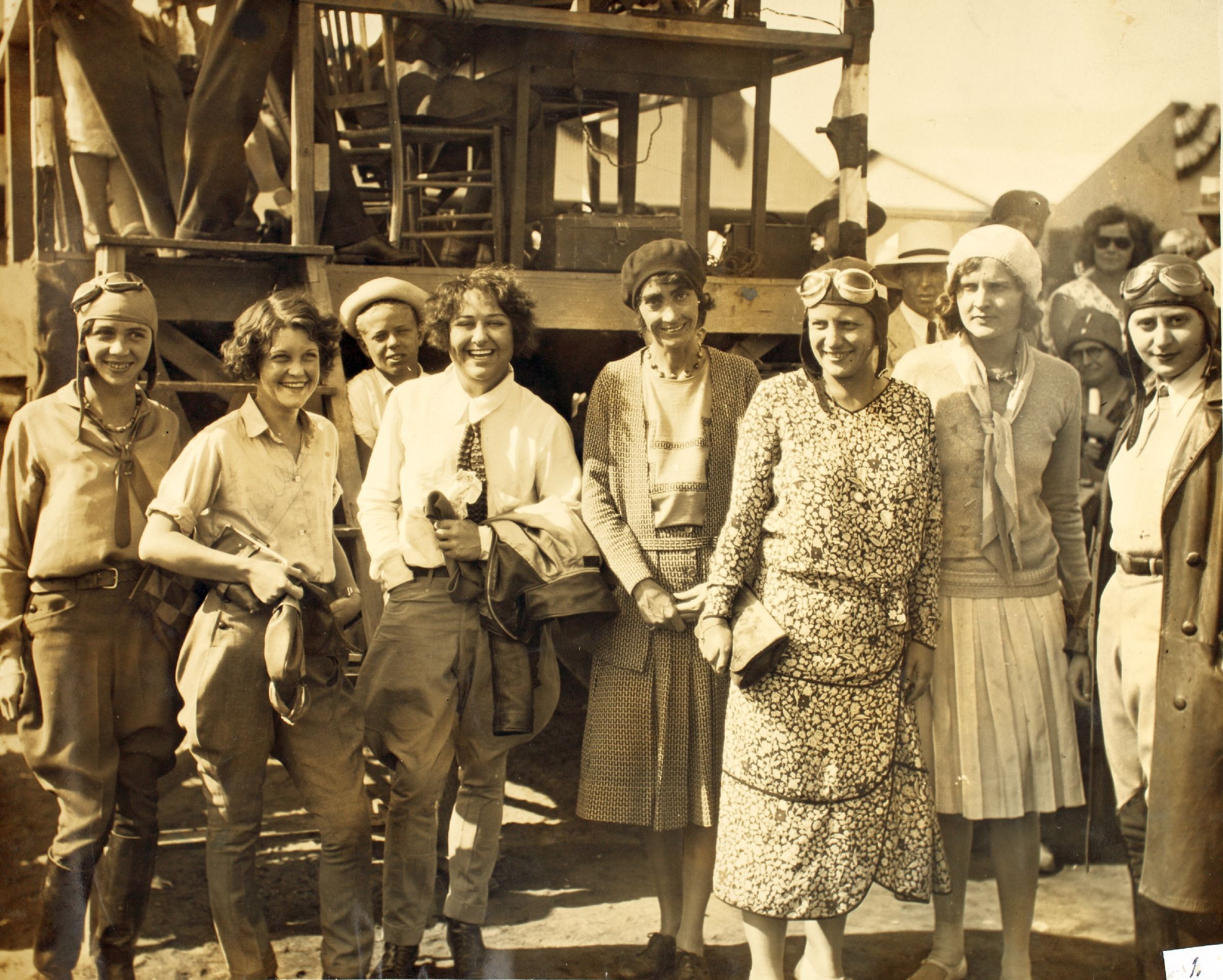
Pancho Barnes and the Women's Air Derby, Long Beach, California, circa 1930–1931

Barnes had extensive connections in Hollywood. Her early close friend George Hurrell (1904–1992), then eking out a living as a painter and photographer in Laguna Beach, California, would later become the head of the portrait department of MGM Studios. Barnes is credited with helping Hurrell start his career in Hollywood after he took the photo she was to use on her pilot's license, introducing him to her Hollywood friends. (Note: Barnes encouraged Hurrell's photography and often posed for him. In the photo for her pilot's license, Hurrell had her strike "a masculine pose, complete with cigarette and grimy fingernails".) In a short period of time, Hurrell became the most in-demand photographer in Hollywood. (Note: Barnes introduced him to Ramon Novarro, another good friend of Pancho's. She also introduced Novarro to fellow aviator Moye Stephens and travel-adventure writer Richard Halliburton. Pancho quickly formed friendships with other stars such as Susan Oliver and Richard Arlen.)

Barnes lost most of her money in the Great Depression. By 1935, she had only her apartment in Hollywood left. She sold it, and in March 1935 bought 180 acres (73 ha) of land in the Mojave Desert, near the Rogers dry lake bed and the nascent Muroc Field, then called March Field because it was an adjunct property of March Army Air Base at that time.

== The Happy Bottom Riding Club ==
On her land, Pancho Barnes built the Happy Bottom Riding Club, also known as the Rancho Oro Verde Fly-Inn Dude Ranch, a dude ranch and restaurant which catered to airmen at the nearby airfield and her friends from Hollywood. Barnes became very close friends with many of the early test pilots, including Chuck Yeager, Robert Anderson "Bob" Hoover, Walt Williams, Jack Ridley, General Jimmy Doolittle, Buzz Aldrin, North American Aviation flight test mechanic Bob Cadick, and flight test supervisor Roy Ferren. Barnes' ranch became famous for the parties and high-flying lifestyle of all the guests.

After successful flight trials, the Muroc and Edwards test pilots often enjoyed some good times at the Happy Bottom Riding Club. As proprietor, Barnes would offer them a customary free steak dinner for breaking the sound barrier.

A change of command in 1952, however, contributed to Barnes getting into a conflict with the United States Air Force (USAF). The USAF was planning for the future of aviation, and decided it needed to build a new, super-long runway to accommodate new aircraft that were being planned to run on atomic power. That new runway would run directly across her ranch. The USAF originally offered her a price for her ranch, land, and facilities that was very close to the cost of undeveloped desert land. She requested a fair appraisal to better reflect the actual cost of replacement of her land and business, but in the midst of getting a re-appraisal, the base leadership accused her of running a house of ill-repute on her ranch. The effect of even the hint of impropriety resulted in her ranch and business being put off-limits to military personnel, and the value of her business plummeted.

Barnes then filed a lawsuit against the USAF to, as she put it, "Roust out the scoundrels in the government who would perpetrate such an injustice." She knew that if she filed a lawsuit, she would have the opportunity to depose under oath the various leaders and personnel on base, and the truth would come out and clear her name. During the height of the intense court battle, in 1953, her ranch burned in a fire of mysterious origin. After the fire, the value of her ranch and business further plummeted to a level more closely reflecting the original buy-out offer from the USAF. Nonetheless, the court battle continued. Barnes was determined to receive fair value for her land and business, and to clear her name. A main contention of her case was: "My grandfather founded the United States Air Force." On that argument, the court found in her favor and she was awarded $375,000 remuneration for her property and business. Also, her name was cleared. As it turned out, the proposed runway was never built.

After the government bought her out, she moved to Cantil, California, in hopes of restarting a similar dude ranch business there. It never happened. It was not until the late 1960s that Barnes once again became a commonplace figure at the base and began to be referred to as the "Mother of Edwards AFB." The wounds began to heal as Barnes reconnected with many old-timers. The officer's mess at Edwards was renamed the Pancho Barnes Room.

== Death ==
Barnes suffered from breast cancer, likely the ultimate cause of her death. She was scheduled to be the keynote speaker at the Antelope Valley Aero Museum's annual "Barnstormers Reunion" on April 5, 1975. However, when a friend called on March 30, 1975, she could not reach her. Her son Bill found her dead in her home, and the coroner determined that she had died nearly a week earlier. Bill obtained special permission, which was granted from the United States Air Force, to spread her ashes over the site of the Happy Bottom Riding Club. He then flew an aircraft over the site, but a crosswind came up, sweeping the ashes back into the small Cessna aircraft, to be carried aloft again. "Even in death Barnes still loved a good joy ride."

== Legacy ==
Her fourth husband, Eugene "Mac" McKendry, continued to live in Cantil and survived Barnes for many years.

Son Bill Barnes died piloting a North American P-51 Mustang flying near Fox Field in Lancaster on October 4, 1980 along with aviation mechanic Clifton Hellwig. In 1940, she had founded Barnes Aviation of Lancaster, which Bill operated in his adult years. It remains in the general aviation business today.

Her life and personality were portrayed in the 1983 epic film The Right Stuff, adapted from Tom Wolfe's bestselling 1979 book of the same name. Kim Stanley played her. She was also the subject of a heavily fictionalized 1988 TV film, Pancho Barnes, written by John Michael Hayes, directed by Richard Heffron, and starring Valerie Bertinelli. The first biography about Barnes was published in 1986, The Lady Who Tamed Pegasus: The Story of Pancho Barnes, written by Grover Ted Tate, who relied heavily upon the copyrighted autobiographical materials of Pancho Barnes. In 1996, a second biography appeared, Pancho: The Biography of Florence Lowe Barnes, written by Barbara Schultz. A third biography appeared in 2000, written by Lauren Kessler, The Happy Bottom Riding Club: The Life and Times of Pancho Barnes.

PBS sponsored a documentary film, The Legend of Pancho Barnes and the Happy Bottom Riding Club, completed in 2009. In it, Kathy Bates provides the voice of Barnes. The documentary was made independently of the estate of Barnes. However, the estate gave the film makers full access to her personal papers and photographs as well as her copyrighted autobiography that are owned by the estate. The film, which chronicles Barnes' life story, was produced and written by Nick T. Spark and directed by Amanda Pope in affiliation with KOCE-TV, a PBS station in Orange County, California. The documentary won an Emmy for best arts and history documentary.

Barnes' Mystery Ship #32 was for a long time located in a hangar at Mojave Airport. It was sold to a private collector a number of years ago, and is currently in the United Kingdom, where it has been restored. (Note: Paul Mantz had later purchased the aircraft and used it extensively in film work. Years later, Barnes bought it back in an auction where other pilots made sure nobody bid against her.)

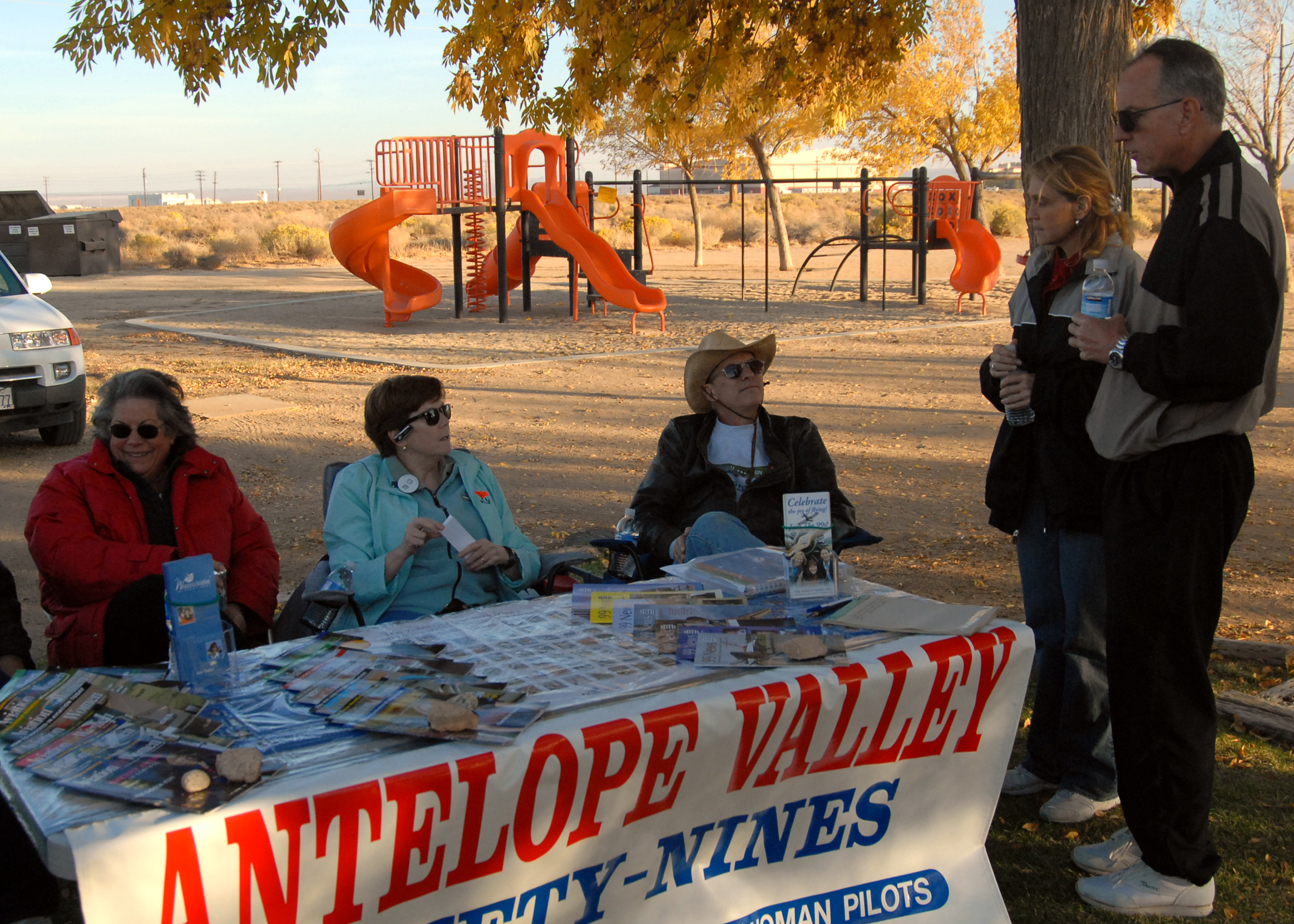
Members of the Ninety-Nines and their families talk to attendees at Pancho Barnes Day, November 7, 2009.

The Happy Bottom Riding Club historical site is the location for the annual USAF Test Pilot School/Edwards Air Force Base Pancho Barnes Day celebration (established in 1980). A barbecue is held and drinks are served, along with dancing and live music in remembrance of this aviation pioneer and friend. Family hour extends until approximately 9 pm, after which it is an adults-only party, perhaps in remembrance of the raucous old days of Happy Bottom Riding Club.

Pancho Barnes and the Happy Bottom Flying Club are visited by a young Hal Jordan in the comic series DC: The New Frontier.

In the 2019 film Captain Marvel, Captain Marvel's fighter pilot bar is called Pancho's Bar, which is a reference to Barnes's nickname "Pancho".
