= Lauren Kessler =

American writer

- Education: Northwestern University (BSJ); University of Oregon (MS); University of Washington (PhD)
- Occupations: Author; immersion journalist
- Writing career
- Genre: Non-fiction
- Website: www.laurenkessler.com

Lauren Kessler is an American author, and immersion journalist who specializes in narrative nonfiction. She teaches storytelling for social change at the University of Washington and for the Forum of Journalism and Media in Vienna.

== Biography ==
Lauren Kessler's education includes Ph.D., University of Washington; M.S., University of Oregon, and B.S.J., Northwestern University.

Kessler is the author of eleven works of narrative nonfiction including 2023 Oregon Book Award-winner, Free: Two Years, Six Lives, and the Long Journey Home (Sourcebooks, 2022), A Grip of Time: When prison is your life (Red Lightning Books, 2019), Raising the Barre: Big Dreams, False Starts and My Midlife Quest to Dance The Nutcracker (Da Capo Press, 2015); Counterclockwise: My Year of Hypnosis, Hormones and Other Adventures in the World of Anti-Aging (Rodale, Inc., Emmaus, Pennsylvania, 2013); and My Teenage Werewolf: A Mother, A Daughter, A Journey Through the Thicket of Adolescence (Penguin Books, 2011).

Her book, Dancing with Rose (renamed Finding Life in the Land of Alzheimer's in its paperback edition), won the Pacific Northwest Booksellers Association Award and was named a Best Book of the Year by Library Journal. Her Oregon Book Award-winning book, Stubborn Twig, was chosen to be the statewide "Oregon Reads" selection in celebration of the state's 150th birthday.

Kessler is also author of Washington Post best-seller Clever Girl: Elizabeth Bentley, the Spy Who Ushered in the McCarthy Era, a biography of Elizabeth Bentley, and the Los Angeles Times best-seller and Oregon Book Award finalist The Happy Bottom Riding Club, a biography of aviator Florence Pancho Barnes. David Letterman, in playful competition with Oprah, chose The Happy Bottom Riding Club as the first (and only) book for "Dave's Book Club." Kessler appeared on his show twice.

Kessler's journalism and essays have appeared in The New York Times Magazine, the Los Angeles Times Magazine, O, The Oprah Magazine, Ladies' Home Journal, Woman's Day, Prevention, Newsweek, Salon.com, The Nation, Nieman Storyboard, Writer's Digest and farmer-ish. Many of her essays on writing are compiled in The Write Path: Essays on the Art of Writing and the Joy of Reading (Monroe Press, 2015). She writes a weekly essay, published at Lauren Chronicles on her author site, laurenkessler.com

She was inducted into the Alumni Hall of Fame (University of Washington) and the Hall of Achievement (University of Oregon).
