= Justin Hocking (writer) =

American writer (born 1973)

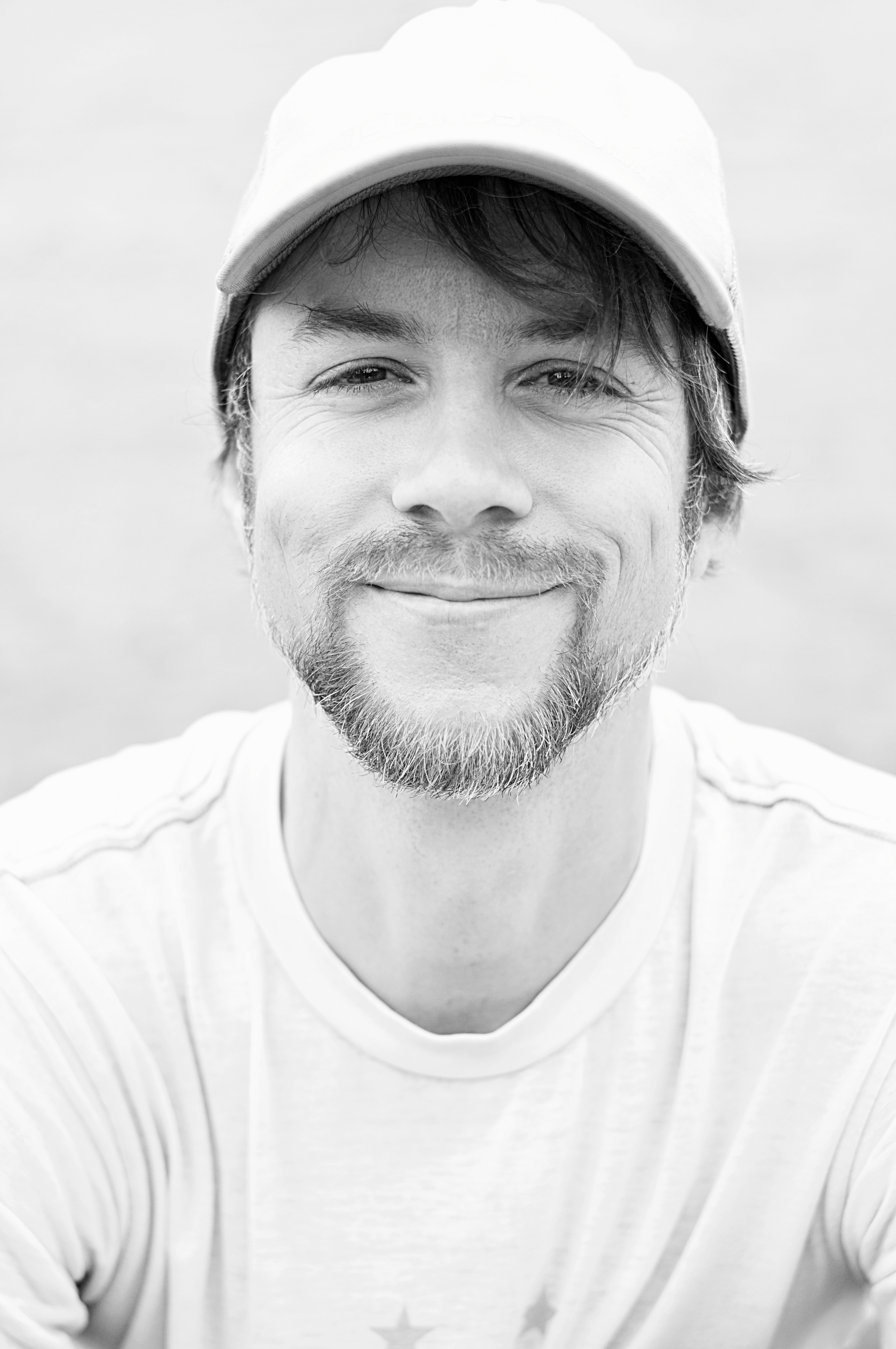

Justin Hocking (born August 2, 1973) is an American essayist and writer of memoir, literary nonfiction, and short stories.

His memoir, The Great Floodgates of the Wonderworld, won the 2015 Oregon Book Award in Creative Nonfiction (The Sarah Winnemuca Award) and was a finalist for the 2015 PEN Center USA Literary award for Creative Nonfiction. Oregon Book Award judge John D'Agata described The Great Floodgates of the Wonderworld as a "quiet and brilliant achievement of both emotion and technique." Hocking has also been awarded an Oregon Literary Fellowship in Fiction, four project grant awards from Oregon's Regional Arts and Culture Council, and a 2014 "Rising Star" award from the Portland Monthly magazine. The former executive director of the Independent Publishing Resource Center, Hocking supervised and implemented literary outreach to schools, treatment centers, and correctional facilities. He also founded the Independent Publishing Resource Center's yearlong Certificate Program in Creative Writing and Publishing. Based on his community engagement, the Willamette Writers association awarded him their annual Humanitarian Award in 2014, and Willamette Week named him one of "Ten Writers Who Made Portland." Hocking is also the author of two artisanal letterpress chapbooks, Gallery and Reclamation: Essays, published respectively by Swift Season Press and Wheelhouse Press.

He regularly contributes book reviews for The Portland Mercury, and has written numerous books for young readers, including a 2017 title about Johannes Gutenberg and the invention of the printing press. He was a 2016/2017 Visiting Faculty member in Creative Writing at Evergreen State College, and currently teaches creative nonfiction and fiction as a full-time faculty member in the MFA and BFA programs in creative writing at Portland State University. He lives with his wife in Portland, Oregon. As an author, he has been collected by libraries.

== Life and work ==
Justin Hocking was born in Glenwood Springs, Colorado in 1973. At age twelve, he moved with his family to San Diego. He attended college at the University of Colorado, and earned a Master of Fine Arts in Creative Writing at Colorado State University in 2002. During the mid-2000s he lived in New York City, where he worked as an assistant editor at Citadel Underground. In 2006 he relocated to Portland, Oregon to assume the executive director position at the Independent Publishing Resource Center. He is a contributing editor for the literary magazines Big Big Wednesday and The Normal School, and his work has appeared in Orion, Tin House, The Rumpus, Poets & Writers magazine, the Oregonian, the Portland Monthly, The Normal School, and elsewhere.

== Awards and grants ==
- 2020 Finalist for Columbia Journal's Spring Fiction Contest
- 2019 Special Mention in the Pushcart Prize fiction anthology
- 2019/20 Regional Arts and Culture Council Project Grant Award
- 2018 Pushcart Prize Nomination from Leaf Litter Magazine
- 2018 Honorable Mention in the Raymond Carver Short Story Contest
- 2018 Semi-Finalist for the VanderMay Nonfiction Prize
- 2017 Stewart H. Holbrook Literary Legacy Award (awarded to the IPRC organization and staff for seventeen years of literary outreach)
- 2016/2017 Regional Arts and Culture Council Project Grant award
- The 2015 Oregon Book Award for Creative Nonfiction (The Sarah Winnemuca Award)
- Finalist for the 2015 Pen Center USA Literary Award for Creative Nonfiction
- 2015 Oregon Literary Fellowship in Fiction
- 2015/16 Regional Arts and Culture Council Project Grant Award
- 2014 Humanitarian Award from The Willamette Writers association
- 2014/15 Regional Arts and Culture Council Project Grant award
- 2014 Rising Star award from Portland Monthly magazine
- 2013/14 Regional Arts and Culture Council Project Grant award
- 2010 Skidmore Prize (runner up)

== Affiliations ==
Hocking was a member of a Portland-based writing group with Lidia Yuknavitch, Chuck Palahniuk, Chelsea Cain, Monica Drake, Suzy Vitello, Erin Leonard, and others.

== Works ==
=== Nonfiction books ===
- A Field Guide to the Subterranean: A Memoir, Forthcoming June 2025.
- "The Gutenberg Bible". Rosen Publishing, 2017.
- "Reclamation: Essays". Wheelhouse Press. 2016
- "The Great Floodgates of the Wonderworld: A Memoir". Graywolf Press. 2014

=== Fiction ===
- "Gallery". Swift Season Press. 2015.

=== Poetry/hybrid ===
- "PS: The Wolves". Two Plum Press. October 2019.

=== Anthologized works ===
- "City of Weird: 30 Otherworldly Portland Tales". Forest Avenue Press. 2016.
- "Portland Noir". Akashic Press, 2010.
