= Alphabet of Dreams =

2006 novel by Susan Fletcher

- Author: Susan Fletcher
- Illustrator: Rick Britton
- Cover artist: Krista Vossen
- Language: English
- Genre: Fantasy
- Publisher: Atheneum Books for Young Readers
- Publication date: 22 August 2006
- Publication place: United States
- Media type: Print ()
- ISBN: 978-0-689-85042-4

Alphabet of Dreams (2006) is a novel by an American novelist Susan Fletcher. It was first published on 22 August 2006.

== Plot introduction ==
Young Babak has a magnificent gift: He can dream the future. Mitra, his brave older sister, is sworn to protect him. For them to survive living on the streets, she must do whatever is necessary—including using her brother's talent for profit. When Babak is asked to dream for a powerful Magus, he receives a mysterious vision of two stars dancing in the night. Determined to solve this prophetic riddle, the Magus takes the boy and his sister on an arduous journey across the desert. What they discover will change the world in a way that no dream could ever predict....

== Awards ==
Alphabet of Dreams received recognition as a 2007 Best Book for Young Adults from the American Library Association.
