= Carl Adamshick =

American poet (born 1969)

- Born: 1969 (age 56–57); Toledo, Ohio, U.S.
- Occupations: Poet, publisher
- Writing career
- Notable works: Curses and Wishes
- Notable awards: Walt Whitman award (2010)
- Website: Carl Adamshick

Carl Adamshick (born 1969) is an American poet. He is the author of two poetry collections, Curses and Wishes, winner of the 2010 Walt Whitman award of the Academy of American Poets and Saint Friend, published in 2014. Adamshick was the editor and publisher of Tavern Books.

== Biography ==
Carl Adamshick was born in 1969 in Toledo, Ohio and spent his early years in Harvard, Illinois. Adamshick moved to Portland, Oregon when he was 21, where he worked as a printer.

Adamshick's manuscript, Curses and Wishes, was selected by Marvin Bell for the 2010 Walt Whitman award. Louisiana State University Press published the poetry collection in 2011. The book won the Stafford/Hall Book award for Literary Arts in 2012 and after the success of his first book, Adamshick was hired as a teacher in a private school. With poet, Michael McGriff, Adamshick founded Tavern Books, a poetry press based in Portland, Oregon.

Adamshick published his second poetry collection, Saint Friend (McSweeney's) in 2014. He was the editor and publisher of Tavern Books, a small publishing company that specialized in poetry. However it collapsed after allegations of financial improprieties by Mr. Adamshick. He lives in Portland, Oregon.
