= Cindy Williams Gutiérrez =

American poet and dramatist

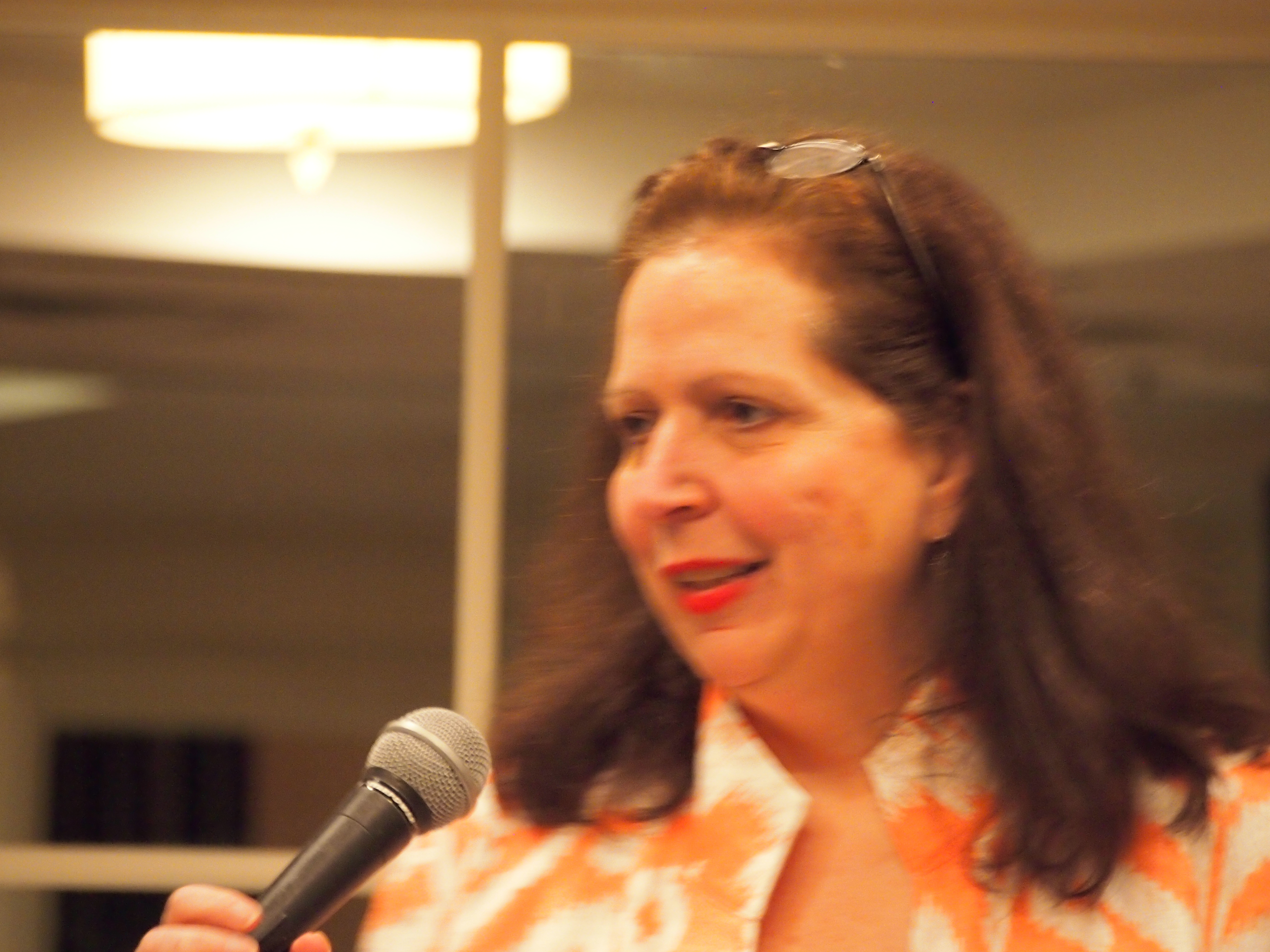
- Born: Brownsville, Texas, U.S.
- Education: University of Southern Maine
- Occupation: Poet
- Writing career
- Genre: Poetry

Cindy Williams Gutiérrez is an American poet and dramatist.

== Early life and education ==
Gutierrez was born and raised in Brownsville, Texas.

She earned an MFA from the University of Southern Maine Stonecoast Program.

== Career ==
In 2014, Poets & Writers named Gutiérrez a notable debut poet. In 2015, she was a finalist in the International Latino Book Awards. Gutiérrez received a 2016 Oregon Literary Fellowship.

== Publications ==
- the small claim of bones (Bilingual Press/Editorial Bilingüe, 2014)
