= Elizabeth Green =

Elizabeth Green may refer to:

- Elizabeth A. H. Green (1906–1995), American violinist, conductor, and music educator
- Elizabeth Shippen Green (1871–1954), American illustrator
- Elizabeth Green the Stork Woman (1905–2001), American sideshow performer
- Elizabeth Green (politician) (died 1937), American politician
- Elizabeth Underwood (c. 1790–1858), née Green
- Liz Green (broadcaster), radio presenter
- Liz Green (musician), English singer-songwriter
- Beth Green (The Bill), The Bill character
- Beth Green (photographer) (born 1949), American photographer
- Betsy Brannon Green (born 1958), mystery/suspense novelist

== See also ==
- Eliza S. Craven Green (1803–1866), poet
- Elizabeth Greene (disambiguation)
