= Frances O'Connor (disambiguation) =

Frances O'Connor is the name of:

- Frances O'Connor, an English-born Australian actress (born 1967)
- Frances O'Connor (performer), sideshow performer (1914-1982)

== See also ==
- Francis O'Connor (disambiguation)
