= Eleanor Smith =

Eleanor Smith may refer to:

- Eleanor Smith (activist) (1822–1896), Irish educational activist
- Eleanor Smith (suffragist) (1828–1913), New Zealand suffragist and magazine editor
- Eleanor Sophia Smith (1858–1942), American composer and educator
- Lady Eleanor Smith (1902–1945), English writer
- Eleanor Smith (politician) (born 1957), British Labour Party MP

== See also ==
- Elinor Smith (1911–2010), pioneering American aviator
- Elenore Smith Bowen, pen name of American cultural anthropologist Laura Bohannan (1922–2002)
- Rosalynn Carter (1927–2023, born Eleanor Rosalynn Smith), American first lady
- Ellie Smith, 2014 winner of Miss Nevada
- Ella Smith (disambiguation)
- Ellen Smith (disambiguation)
- Helen Smith (disambiguation)
