= Ellen Smith =

Ellen Smith may refer to:

- Ellen Smith (Fabian), British suffragette and social reformer
- Ellen Smith, alias for Muriel Scott (1888–1963), Scottish suffragette
- Poor Ellen Smith, 19th century popular murder ballad
- Ellen M. Smith Three-Decker (built 1908), house in Worcester, Massachusetts
- Mary Ellen Smith (died 1933), Canadian politician

== See also ==
- Eleanor Smith (disambiguation)
- Helen Smith (disambiguation)
