= Armless wonder =

Sideshow performer

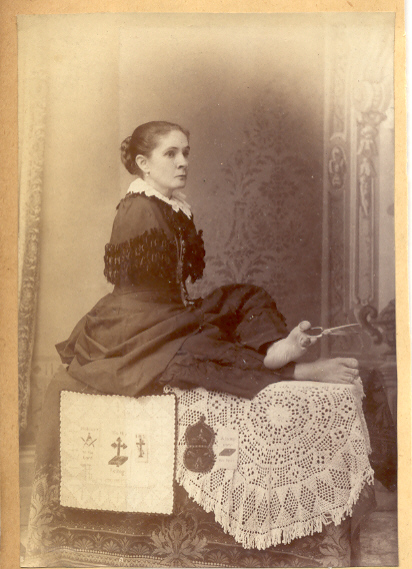
Anne Leak, an Armless Wonder using a pair of scissors with her feet

An armless wonder was a person without arms who was exhibited, usually at a circus sideshow. Typically (but not exclusively) a woman, she would perform various tricks using her feet and toes, such as smoking a cigarette or writing. Frequently, she would have a supply of visiting cards which, for an extra charge, she would sign with her feet and give to onlookers.

== Role in sideshow ==
The armless wonder was often one of the most highly paid people of the sideshow. In times when the exposure of even a female ankle was considered risqué, a pretty young woman who performed feats of dexterity with her bare feet and toes would inevitably attract a great deal of prurient interest.

== Performers ==
Examples of armless wonders of the early 20th century are Frances O'Connor and Martha Morris, both of whom also appeared in the 1932 film, Freaks. Another example from the late 19th century was Ann E. Leak (pictured) who usually included a few simple lines of verse when she signed her visiting cards, such as the following:

So you perceive it's really true,
When hands are lacking, toes will do.

Examples of male armless wonders are Carl Unthan and Charles B. Tripp.
