= Washington and Lee Swing =

- Fight song of Washington and Lee University
- Also known as: "The Swing"
- Lyrics: Clarence A. (Tod) Robbins
- Music: Mark W. Sheafe and Thornton Whitney Allen
- Published: 1910

"Washington and Lee Swing" is the official fight song of Washington and Lee University. It was written in 1910 by Mark W. Sheafe, Clarence A. (Tod) Robbins, and Thornton W. Allen. It is widely used as the primary school song by other universities and high schools within the United States, with varying degrees of attribution to the original.

The song is also used as a standard in swing music, dixieland, and bluegrass repertoire. Artists such as Glenn Miller, Tex Beneke, Louis Armstrong, Kay Kyser, Hal Kemp and the Dukes of Dixieland have recorded popular versions of the song.

It was featured in movies such as The Five Pennies and You've Got Mail.

"Washington and Lee Swing" may have been influenced by "Zacatecas March" an earlier Mexican march written in 1891 by Genaro Codina.

== Usage in other schools ==
While the original song was written for Washington and Lee University, many high schools and universities have adopted the tune as their own and modified it to varying degrees.

In the early part of the 20th century Mississippi State University, used a specially adapted version of the "Washington and Lee Swing" with words suitable for a college song.
