= Elizabeth Green the Stork Woman =

American sideshow performer

Elizabeth Green the Bird Girl
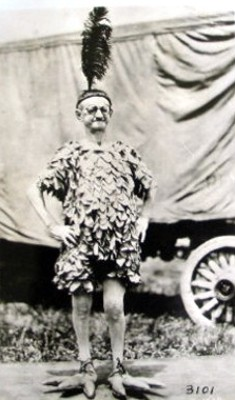
- Born: October 10, 1905; Pittsfield, Massachusetts, United States
- Died: May 9, 2001 (aged 95); Longmeadow, Massachusetts, United States
- Other names: Koo-Koo, the Bird Girl, Molina the Pinhead
- Occupation: Sideshow performer/film actress
- Known for: Appearance in film Freaks 1932
- Notable work: work with Ringling Brothers Circus, Cole Bros. Circus

Elizabeth "Bette" Green, (October 10, 1905 – May 9, 2001) billed professionally as Koo-Koo the Bird Girl or just Bird Girl, was an American sideshow performer who was presented to audiences as a human stork. Her large, long nose and thin bone structure earned her the "Stork-Woman" title. A genetic condition was responsible for her unusual features, though she had no other known medical problems. She was known for her appearance in Tod Browning's 1932 cult classic film Freaks.

== Sideshow career ==
Green was the actual "first" performer to be billed as Koo-Koo the Bird Girl and toured with Ringling Brothers Circus and Cole Bros. Circus. Hers was mainly a comedy act, and it involved her dancing around in a feathered body suit with large bird feet and a long feather on her head. Some claim Green was used at the entrance of the circus, being one of the "less weird-looking" freaks, to catch the attention of passers by. She has also been referred to as "Molina the Pinhead"; however, this was probably only to differentiate between her and Minnie Woolsey who was billed as Koo-Koo the Bird Girl in the film Freaks.

== Film ==
Green is most prominently known for her appearance in Tod Browning's 1932 film Freaks where she is billed as the "Bird-Girl". She appears in several scenes throughout the movie and has one scene of dialogue alongside Frances O'Connor (the armless girl) while they are seated at a table eating dinner.

In the film, Minnie Woolsey received the billing of Koo-Koo the Bird Girl, and is most commonly associated with the billing because she, rather than Elizabeth Green, was featured in the table dance scene, during the wedding feast. Although what Green thought of her new competition is unknown, she afterwards however returned to her billing as Koo-Koo the Bird Girl in sideshows.

== See also ==
- Koo-Koo the Bird Girl
