= Baby Bunny Smith =

American actress and sideshow performer

- Born: Helen Smith; 1888
- Died: 1951 (aged 62 or 63)
- Occupation: Circus sideshow performer
- Spouse: Peter Robinson (m. 1916)
- Children: 2

Helen "Baby Bunny" Smith (1888–1951) was an American sideshow performer. She made her living traveling with sideshows in the early 20th century, billed as a circus fat lady.

Smith was born in 1888. Despite a normal childhood, she became very heavy during grammar school. She left school and took a job as a sideshow performer at the age of 13. Her weight ballooned to as much as 689 lb (313 kg). She was billed as "Baby Bunny Smith" during her sideshow career and settled at Coney Island. She met her husband, 58-pound Peter Robinson, a fellow sideshow performer known and billed as "the human skeleton", in the cult film classic Freaks. They had two children.
