= Frank O'Connor (disambiguation) =

Frank O'Connor (1903–1966) was an Irish author.

Frank O'Connor may also refer to:

- Frank O'Connor (director) (1881–1959), American actor, director and screenwriter
- Frank O'Connor (basketball), Irish Olympic basketball player
- Frank O'Connor (actor, born 1897) (1897–1979), American actor, rancher, and painter, husband of Ayn Rand
- Frank D. O'Connor (1909–1992), American politician from New York City
- Frank O'Connor (baseball) (1868–1913), American baseball pitcher
- Frank Patrick O'Connor (1885–1939), Canadian politician, businessman, and founder of Laura Secord Chocolates
- Frank O'Connor (rugby league) (1906–1964), Australian rugby league footballer
- SS Frank O'Connor (1892–1919), a 1919 shipwreck in Lake Michigan
- Frank O'Connor (public servant) (1894–1972), senior Australian public servant
- Frank O'Connor (Australian rules footballer) (1923–2017), Australian rules footballer for Melbourne
- Raymond O'Connor (footballer) (1913–1980), also known as Frank, English footballer

== See also ==
- Francis O'Connor (disambiguation)
