= Schlitzie =

American sideshow performer (1901–1971)

- Born: Simon Metz? September 10, 1901; The Bronx, New York, U.S.
- Died: September 24, 1971 (aged 70); Los Angeles, California, U.S.
- Other name: Schlitze Surtees

Schlitzie (alternatively spelled Schlitze or Shlitze; September 10, 1901 – September 24, 1971), possibly born Simon Metz and legally Schlitze Surtees, was an American sideshow performer. He also appeared in a few films, and is best known for his role in the 1932 movie Freaks. His lifelong career on the outdoor entertainment circuit as a major sideshow attraction with Barnum & Bailey, among others, made him a popular cultural icon.

== Biography ==
Schlitzie's true birth date, name, location and parents are unknown. Information on his death certificate and gravesite indicate he was born on September 10, 1901, in The Bronx, New York, though some sources have claimed he was born in Santa Fe, New Mexico. Claims he was born in Yucatán, Mexico, are mistaken reflections of Schlitzie's occasional fanciful billing as "Maggie, last of the Aztec Children".

Information about Schlitzie's identity at birth may never be known, the information having been lost as he was handed off to various carnivals in a long line of mostly informal guardianships throughout his career. Those who knew Schlitzie described him as an affectionate, exuberant, sociable person who loved dancing, singing, and being the center of attention, performing for anyone he could stop and talk with.

== Medical condition ==
Schlitzie was born with microcephaly, a neurodevelopmental disorder characterized by an unusually small head and brain. The condition resulted in a short stature of 4 feet (120 cm), myopia, and severe intellectual disability.

According to carnival historian Francis Hornberger, Schlitzie's cognitive abilities were estimated to be comparable to those of a three-year-old. He required lifelong supervision, spoke primarily in single words or short phrases, and was unable to care fully for himself. Nevertheless, he could perform simple tasks, appeared to understand much of what was said to him, and was noted for his quick reactions and ability to imitate the actions of others.

Some authors have proposed that Schlitzie's physical characteristics may have been consistent with Seckel syndrome, although no definitive diagnosis was made during his lifetime.

== Care and guardianship ==
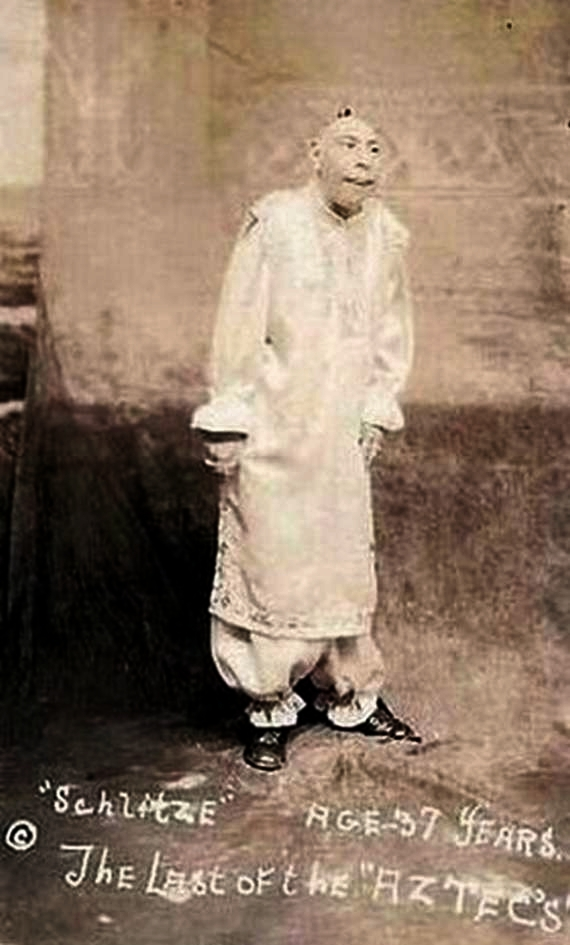
Schlitzie in 1938, billed as The Last of the Aztecs

Much of Schlitzie's early life remains unknown, but he is believed to have entered the carnival world as a young child after being placed in the care of sideshow operators. Throughout his life, he passed through a succession of mostly informal guardianships, circumstances that contributed to the loss of information about his birth, identity, and family.

While touring with the Tom Mix Circus in 1935, Schlitzie, then about 33 years old, was legally adopted by George Surtees, a chimpanzee trainer whose act also appeared with the circus. Surtees became Schlitzie's legal guardian and cared for him over the next three decades, during which Schlitzie continued to perform on the sideshow circuit.

Surtees died in 1965, when Schlitzie was about 64 years old. Surtees' daughter, who was not involved in show business, then admitted Schlitzie to a Los Angeles County hospital. He remained there until he was recognized by sword swallower Bill "Frenchy" Unks, who was working at the hospital during the carnival off-season. According to Unks, Schlitzie seemed to miss the carnival badly and appeared depressed after being separated from the public eye. Hospital authorities determined that his care would be better served by making him a ward of showman Sam Alexander and returning him to the sideshow, where he continued performing until 1968, when he was about 67 years old.

== Career ==
On the sideshow circuit, microcephalic people were usually promoted as "pinheads" or "missing links", and Schlitzie was billed under such titles as "The Last of the Aztecs", "The Monkey Girl", and "What Is It?". In some sideshows, he was paired with another microcephalic performer.

Schlitzie was often dressed in a muumuu and presented as either female or androgynous to add to the mystique of his unusual appearance. Those who knew him alternately used masculine and feminine pronouns. His urinary incontinence, which obliged him to wear diapers, made dresses practical for his care needs, although it is possible that the incontinence did not develop until later in life and was simply a side-effect of age.

The sideshow circuit was a tremendous success for Schlitzie; throughout the 1920s and 1930s he was employed by many upscale circuses, including Ringling Bros. and Barnum & Bailey Circus, Clyde Beatty Circus, Tom Mix Circus, Crafts 20 Big Shows, and Foley & Burke Carnival. In 1928, Schlitzie made his film debut in The Sideshow, a drama set in a circus, which featured a variety of actual sideshow performers.

=== Freaks and later work ===
Schlitzie landed his best-known role as an actor in Tod Browning's 1932 horror film Freaks. Like The Sideshow, Freaks takes place at a carnival and features a number of genuine sideshow performers, including conjoined twins Daisy and Violet Hilton, "The Living Torso" Prince Randian, and dwarf siblings Harry and Daisy Earles. Schlitzie has a scene of (unintelligible) dialogue with actor Wallace Ford. Two other "pinheads" also appear in the film. When referring to Schlitzie, other actors use feminine pronouns.

When Freaks premiered in 1932, cinema audiences were scandalized by the appearance of sideshow performers. The United Kingdom banned the film for thirty years. The film was a financial failure, and Browning, although he went on to make several more films for MGM, retired in 1940.

Schlitzie appeared in bit roles in various movies and is credited with a role in the 1934 film Tomorrow's Children as a mentally defective criminal who undergoes forced sterilization.

In 1941, Schlitzie appeared in his final film role as "Princess Bibi", a sideshow attraction, in Meet Boston Blackie.

== Final years ==
In his later years, Schlitzie lived in Los Angeles, occasionally performing on various sideshow circuits both locally and internationally (he frequently performed in Hawaii and London, and his last major appearance was at the 1968 Dobritch International Circus held at the Los Angeles Sports Arena). Schlitzie also became a notable attraction performing on the streets of Hollywood, with his caretakers selling his stock carnival souvenir pictures. Schlitzie spent time in his final days on Santa Monica Boulevard. He liked going to MacArthur Park at Alvarado Street and Wilshire Boulevard, where he would visit the lake with his guardian, feeding the pigeons and ducks and performing for passersby.

== Death ==
On September 24, 1971, at 70 years old, Schlitzie died at Fountain View Convalescent Home. His death certificate listed his official name as "Shlitze Surtees" and his birthdate as 1901.

== Cultural legacy ==
In the 1960s, Freaks was rediscovered and enjoyed a long run as one of the first midnight movies, becoming a cult classic; in 1994, the film was selected by the National Film Registry as being "culturally, historically, or aesthetically significant". The film became the public's major exposure to Schlitzie, who remains one of the more memorable characters in the film.

Schlitzie's iconic image has lent itself to many products, including masks, hats, shirts, models, clocks, snow globes, and dolls. Additionally, Schlitzie has been cited as an inspiration for Bill Griffith's comic strip Zippy the Pinhead. In 2019, Griffith released Nobody's Fool, a graphic novel biography of Schlitzie.

The Ramones song "Pinhead", from the 1977 album Leave Home, was inspired by him.

The 2018 game Red Dead Redemption 2 features a side-mission which includes a character called Bertram, whose appearance is modeled on Schlitzie.

== Filmography ==
| Year | Title | Role | Notes |
|---|---|---|---|
| 1928 | The Sideshow | The Geek | Uncredited |
| 1932 | Freaks | Schlitzie the Pin Head | |
| 1932 | Island of Lost Souls | Furry Manimal | Uncredited |
| 1934 | Tomorrow's Children | Patient | Uncredited |
| 1941 | Meet Boston Blackie | Princess Betsy / Bird Woman | Uncredited |
