= Koo-Koo the Bird Girl =

American side show performer (1880- after 1960)

Minnie Woolsey Koo Koo, the Bird Girl
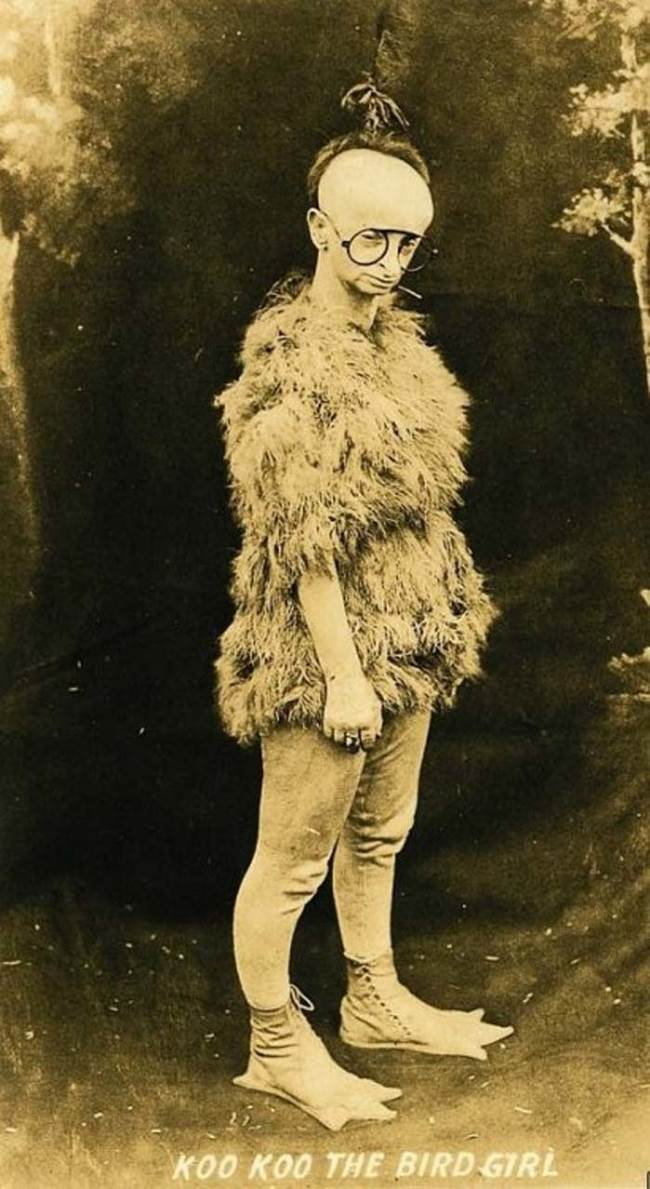
- Born: Minnie Woolsey; 1880; Rabun County, Georgia
- Died: after 1960
- Other names: Minnie Ha Ha; Koo Koo the Bird Girl; Cuckoo Girl; Koo Koo, the Blind Girl from Mars
- Occupations: Entertainer as sideshow entertainer, film performer
- Known for: Freaks film

Minnie Woolsey (1880 – after 1960), billed as Koo-Koo the Bird Girl, was an American side show entertainer, best known for her only film appearance in Tod Browning's film Freaks in 1932.

== Early life ==
Woolsey was born in 1880 in Rabun County, Georgia. She was widely reported to have had Seckel syndrome (also known as Virchow–Seckel syndrome), a rare congenital disorder characterised by severe growth retardation, microcephaly, and distinctive bird-like facial features, including a narrow face, a beak-like nose, large eyes, a receding jaw, and prominent ears. Contemporary accounts also described Woolsey as bald and toothless, and variously reported that she was blind or severely short-sighted, although the extent of her visual impairment is unclear.

== Career ==
Little is known about the beginning of Woolsey's performing career. According to later accounts, she was recruited from a Georgia institution by a travelling showman and performed under the stage name Minnie Ha Ha, a play on Minnehaha, the fictional Native American character in Henry Wadsworth Longfellow's poem The Song of Hiawatha.

Her act featured a feathered costume inspired by stereotypical depictions of Native Americans, with a single feather worn on her head. She danced and spoke gibberish as part of the performance.

By the mid-1920s, Woolsey was performing with Ringling Brothers. In 1924, she appeared in the circus's "Congress of Freaks" promotional photograph alongside many of the era's best-known sideshow performers.

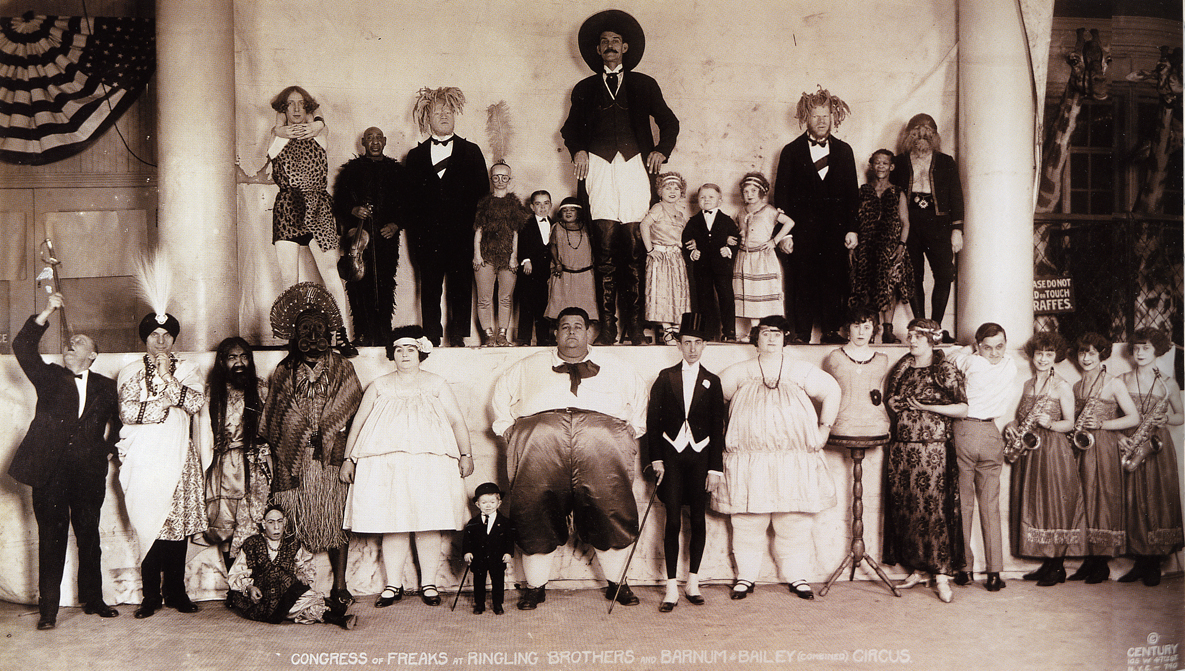
Koo Koo in 1924 (pictured top, fourth from left), was well known for her sideshow career with Ringling Brothers

In 1932, American film director Tod Browning cast Woolsey in the Metro-Goldwyn-Mayer (MGM) film Freaks, which featured numerous sideshow performers. She was billed as Koo Koo, the Bird Girl, although the billing had previously been used by fellow performer Elizabeth Green, who was known professionally as the "Stork Woman". Woolsey appears throughout the film, including the wedding feast, where she dances on the banquet table in her feathered costume.

After filming Freaks, Woolsey returned to sideshow performance. In 1942, the entertainment trade magazine Billboard reported that she was recovering at Coney Island Hospital after breaking her arm in a fall while descending a staircase.

Accounts place Woolsey still performing around 1960, when she was about 80 years old. She was reportedly struck by a car sometime afterward. The date, place, and circumstances of her death remain unknown.

== In popular culture ==
- Australian performer Sarah Houbolt created a performance called Kookoo the Bird Girl.
- She is mentioned in Tom Waits's song "Lucky Day (Overture)" from his album The Black Rider, about sideshow performers.
- Koo-Koo the Bird Girl is alluded to in the Ginger Rogers film Black Widow.

== See also ==
- Elizabeth Green the Stork Woman
