= Tod Robbins =

American horror and mystery writer (1888–1949)

- Born: Clarence Aaron Robbins; June 25, 1888; Brooklyn, New York, U.S.
- Died: May 10, 1949 (aged 60); Saint-Jean-Cap-Ferrat, France
- Occupation: Author
- Writing career
- Genres: Horror, mystery fiction

Clarence Aaron Robbins (25 June 1888 – May 10, 1949), billed as C. A. Robbins and better known as Tod Robbins, was an American author of horror and mystery fiction, particularly novels and short story collections.

== Biography ==
Robbins was born in Brooklyn, June 25, 1888. He attended Washington and Lee University (Lexington, Virginia) and—along with Mark W. Sheafe (1884?–1949) and Thornton Whitney Allen (1890–1944)—wrote the college song "Washington and Lee Swing". Sheafe wrote the tune in 1905, Allen set the music down on paper in 1909, and Robbins provided the words. The completed version was published in 1910.

Robbins authored two short story collections and several novels. His work often contains bizarre and frightening plots, sometimes influenced by writers like Oscar Wilde (Robbins' "The Living Portrait" is a homage to The Picture of Dorian Gray) and Robert W. Chambers. Robbins's Mysterious Martin (1912) is an early novel about a serial killer. His novel, The Unholy Three (1917), was twice adapted for the screen, a silent version directed by Tod Browning in 1925 and a sound version directed by Jack Conway in 1930; both adaptations starred Lon Chaney. Robbins was also the author of the short story "Spurs", which Browning used as the basis for Freaks (1932), a film which later developed a cult following. Some of Robbins's work was later reprinted in the "Creeps" series of horror anthologies edited by Charles Birkin. His novel Fighting Mad reportedly won the $3,000 contest held in 1922 by Physical Culture magazine, serializing the novel beginning with the January 1922 issue.

E. F. Bleiler described Robbins' Who Wants a Green Bottle? as "excellent commercial fiction, with good little touches".

== Emigration ==
Robbins emigrated to the French Riviera from New York City and refused to leave during the Nazi occupation of France. He spent the war in a concentration camp and died in Saint-Jean-Cap-Ferrat in 1949.

== Marriages ==
- Edith Norman Hyde (July 15, 1909 - June 4, 1914; divorced); 2 children
- Lillian Ames Chatman (December 3, 1914 - 1922; divorced)
- Ethel Brown (? - May 1928; divorced)
- Janet Lancey (1929 - 1933; divorced)
- Naomi Kathleen "Mollie" Adamson (January 16, 1934 - May 10, 1949; his death)

== Bibliography ==
=== Novels ===
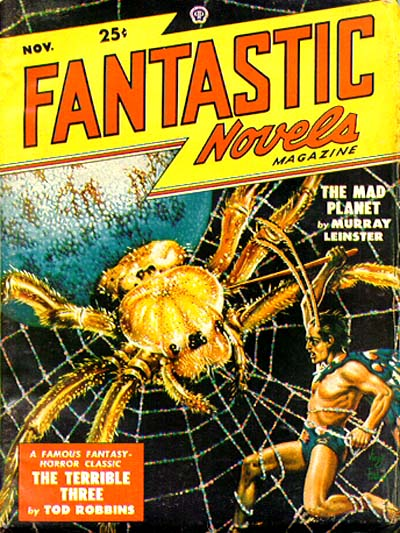
Robbins's The Unholy Three was reprinted in Fantastic Novels in 1948 (under a slightly modified title)

- The Spirit of the Town: A Novel Presentation in Fiction Form of the Impulse and Desire Which Mould the Lives of Men (1912)
- Mysterious Martin: A Fiction Narrative Setting Forth the Development of Character Along Unusual Lines (1912)
- The Unholy Three (1917; rpt. as The Three Freaks in 1935)
- Red of Surley (1919)
- In the Shadow (1929)
- The Master of Murder (1933)
- Close Their Eyes Tenderly (1949)
- To Hell and Home Again (advertised for release in 1950 but unpublished)
- The Original Sin (1927) never published.

=== Short story collections ===
- Silent, White and Beautiful and Other Stories (1920)
  Includes:
  - "Silent, White and Beautiful"
  - "Who Wants a Green Bottle?"
  - "Wild Wullie, the Waster"
  - "For Art's Sake" (revised version of Mysterious Martin)
- Who Wants a Green Bottle? and Other Uneasy Tales (1926)
  Includes:
  - "Silent, White and Beautiful"
  - "Who Wants a Green Bottle?"
  - "Wild Wullie, the Waster"
  - "Toys" (aka "The Toys of Fate")
  - "A Bit of Banshee"
  - "The Son of Shaemas O'Shea"
  - "Cockcrow Inn"
  - "Spurs"
- Freaks and Fantasies (2007)
  Includes:
  - "Crimson Flowers"
  - "Silent, White and Beautiful"
  - "Who Wants a Green Bottle?"
  - "The Bibulous Baby"
  - "Wild Wullie, the Waster"
  - "The Toys of Fate"
  - "An Eccentric"
  - "The Whimpus"
  - "A Bit of Banshee"
  - "The Son of Shaemas O'Shea"
  - "A Voice from Beyond"
  - "Cock-crow Inn"
  - "The Confession"
  - "Spurs"

=== Poetry collections ===
- The Scales of Justice and Other Poems (1915)

=== Pulp magazine appearances ===
- Parisienne, February 1917 ("Married")
- All-Story Weekly, July 14, 1917 ("The Terrible Three", i.e., The Unholy Three)
- The Smart Set, April 1918 ("Silent, White and Beautiful")
- All-Story Weekly, April 5, 1919 ("The Living Portrait")
- The Thrill Book, September 1919 ("Fragments")
- All-Story Weekly, October 25, 1919 ("The Whimpus")
- Munsey's Magazine, January 1921 ("The Toys of Fate")
- Munsey's Magazine, February 1923 ("Spurs")
- Everybody's Magazine, November 1923 ("For His Lady Friend")
- The Forum, 1925 ("The Child and the Man")
- Famous Fantastic Mysteries, September 1939 ("The Whimpus")
- Famous Fantastic Mysteries, September 1942 ("Wild Wullie, the Waster")
- Super Science and Fantastic Stories, June 1945 ("The Toys of Fate")
- Fantastic Novels Magazine, November 1948 ("The Terrible Three")
- Fantastic Novels Magazine, March 1949 ("The Toys of Fate")
- Fantastic Novels Magazine, November 1949 ("The Living Portrait")
- Zoetrope: All-Story, Fall 2002 ("Spurs")

=== Anthology appearances ===
- Creeps (1932), ed. Charles Birkin ("Silent, White and Beautiful", "Spurs" and "Cockcrow Inn")
- Shudders (1932), ed. Charles Birkin ("Toys")
- Shivers (1933), ed. Charles Birkin ("Wild Wullie, the Waster" and "Who Wants a Green Bottle?")
- Nightmares (1933), ed. Charles Birkin ("The Whimpus")
- Thrills (1935), ed. Charles Birkin ("The Confession")
- The Freak Show: Tales of Fantasy and Horror (1970), ed. Peter Haining ("Spurs")
- The Ghouls (1971), ed. Peter Haining ("Freaks", i.e., "Spurs")
- Hallowe'en Hauntings: Stories About the Most Ghostly Night of the Year (1984), ed. Peter Haining ("Cockcrow Inn")
- Famous Fantastic Mysteries (1991), ed. Stefan R. Dziemanozicz, Robert Weinberg and Martin N. Greenburg ("The Toys of Fate")
- The People of the Pit (2010), ed. Gene Christie ("The Living Portrait")
- The Best American Noir of the Century (2010), ed. James Ellroy, Otto Penzler ("Spurs")
