= Josephine Joseph =

American performer

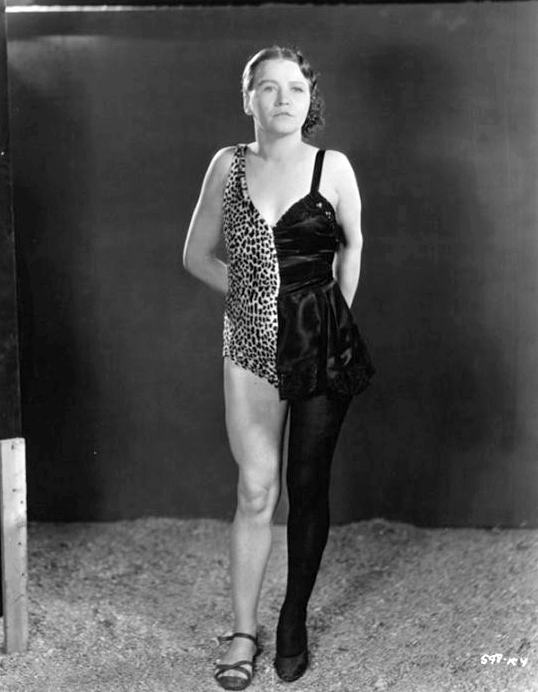
- Joseph in 1932
- Born: c. 1896/1897
- Occupations: sideshow performer, actress
- Spouse: George Waas

Josephine-Joseph (c. 1896/1897) was the stage name of an American performer who was prominent in circus sideshows and the carnival circuits during the early 20th century.

== Biography ==
Josephine-Joseph's birth name as well as date of birth and death is unknown and although prominent in circus performance, JJ is probably best known for her film role in the Tod Browning, pre-code production Freaks in 1932, her only screen credit. Her body was supposedly split down the middle, one side female and the other male. She claimed to be an intersex person or "true hermaphrodite" as it was called in her time, but there is no evidence to confirm whether this was the case; she may have just been a very skilled impersonator, in the style of Albert-Alberta Karas.

Like many sideshow "hermaphrodites" of the early 20th century, she presented a "half and half" trick: woman on the left and man on the right. One side of the body would be exercised, have hair trimmed, and tanned; the other side would be covered and unexercised, making it pale and flabby, so the chest resembled a woman's breast while the hair was grown out. The performer would then wear a split costume: a low-cut, tight top and hotpants on the "female" side and on the "male" side a Tarzan-style loincloth.

Pitch photo of sideshow performer Josephine Joseph, c. 1935

In 1930, Joseph and her husband George Waas—described only in newspaper reports as "an American couple"— who were presenting a Coney Island-style attraction in Blackpool, England under the title of "Josephine-Joseph", were prosecuted in the United Kingdom for false pretences and conspiracy on account of their "Half Woman-Half Man" circus show.

Joseph claimed to the court she was 27 years of age at the time (although in reality she was 33–34). The court alleged that the show was a fraud, and that she was not a true hermaphrodite. Waas offered to submit X-rays of Josephine to the magistrates, but refused to submit her to a court doctor's physical examination. The Superintendent in charge of the case admitted that the two sides of Josephine's body looked different, although he had "no idea what the medical testimony may be". The court descriptions of her appearance also match her costume as seen in the film Freaks. She was described as a man on the right side, and a woman on the left, with her right arm longer than her left. Her eyebrows were different. She displayed a bare right leg with a sandal, and a black-stockinged left leg with a woman's shoe. Her hair was brushed from the right side to the left, giving the impression of short hair on the right side. In order to avoid a jury trial, Joseph and Waas pleaded guilty. Waas told the court "I am sorry. I will give up this show and leave the country". Waas, who served as her manager, was fined £25, whilst Josephine was acquitted.

== Freaks ==
Josephine Joseph is most prominently remembered for a role in the Tod Browning 1932 classic cult film Freaks. Although she only had two lines of dialogue, she still appeared in a number of scenes, most notably the scene at the wedding reception where she is the one who begins the chant: "We accept her, one of us! We accept her, one of us!". In another notable scene early in the film, "Josephine" gives an alluring look towards the strongman to which another performer responds comically "I think she likes you, but he don't!" She is later seen assembling the rest of the circus freaks for their plan of revenge by saying to them: "Soon, we go".

== Personal life ==
She was married to her manager George Waas, who she possibly married in 1917. Much of the performer's personal life, including birth name, date of birth and death, has never been clearly established. Given her presumed age of 33–34 years old during the initial court date regarding her true status as a half-man half-woman, her year of birth would be 1896 or 1897.
