= Helen Smith =

Helen Smith may refer to:

- Helen Fairchild Smith (died 1926), American professor of English literature and Dean of Wells College
- Helen Hay Smith (1873–1918), New Zealand clothing manufacturer and retailer
- Helen Macpherson Schutt (née Smith, 1874–1951), Australian philanthropist
- Helen Douglas Smith (1886–1955), Canadian politician
- Baby Bunny Smith (Helen Smith, 1888–1951), American sideshow performer
- Helen Smith (Connecticut politician) (1901–1996), American politician
- Helen Sobel Smith (1909–1969), American bridge player
- Helen Vandervort Smith (1909–1995), American botanist and paleontologist
- Helen Smith (baseball) (1922–2019), All-American Girls Professional Baseball League player
- Helen Smith (New Zealand politician) (1927–2007), New Zealand politician in the Values Party
- Helen Smith (fencer) (born 1953), Australian Olympic fencer
- Helen Smith (nurse) (1956–1979), British nurse who died in suspicious circumstances in Saudi Arabia
- Helen Smith (writer) (born 1968), English novelist and dramatist
- Helen Smith (psychologist), American forensic psychologist
- Helen Smith (British literary scholar), British scholar of English literature
- Helen Wong Smith, American archivist and librarian
- Helen Smith, character in the television series Moonbase 3

== See also ==
- Hélène Smith (1861–1929), French psychic
- Helen Smythe Jaffray (née Smythe, 1850–1932), American socialite
- Ellen Smith (disambiguation)
