= Spurs (short story) =

Short story by Tod Robbins

- Short story by Tod Robbins
- Country: United States
- Genre: Short story

Publication
- Published in: Munsey's Magazine
- Publication date: February 1923

"Spurs" is a short story by the American author Tod Robbins. The story was published in February 1923 in Munsey's Magazine and included in Robbins' 1926 short story collection Who Wants a Green Bottle? and Other Uneasy Tales. In 1932, the story became the basis for the Tod Browning-produced film Freaks.

== Plot summary ==
In Papa Copo's small traveling circus in France, dwarf performer Jacques Courbé has fallen in love with the troupe's statuesque bareback rider, Jeanne Marie. He proposes marriage and she accepts, because she has learned of his recent large inheritance. She is really in love with her partner Simon Lafleur, and she plans to marry him after what she believes will be an imminent death for Jacques. At the couple's wedding feast, Jeanne Marie drunkenly insults her new husband, declaring that she could carry her "little ape" on her shoulders from one side of France to the other.

A year later, Jacques has retired and taken Jeanne Marie to live on his estate. One night Simon discovers Jeanne Marie on his doorstep. She begs him for protection from Jacques, who is forcing her to make good on her cruel taunt and carry him a distance equal to the width of France on her shoulders. Suddenly, Jacques appears, brandishing a sword, astride his wolfhound, St. Eustache. Simon tries to defend Jeanne Marie but is quickly overpowered by the dog and killed by Jacques. Jeanne Marie resignedly puts Jacques on her shoulders and they resume their journey. As they depart, they are seen by Papa Copo, who remarks "Three old friends! And so Jeanne carries him! Ah, but she should not poke fun at M. Jacques Courbé! He is so sensitive; but, alas, they are the kind that are always henpecked!"

== Film adaptation ==
Director and producer Tod Browning convinced the movie studio Metro-Goldwyn-Mayer to buy the rights to "Spurs" in the 1920s. Browning began working to adapt the story as early as 1927 and was given the greenlight to direct by MGM production supervisor Irving Thalberg in June 1931. The final script, titled Freaks, retained little of the original source material other than the marriage of a wealthy dwarf to an average-sized performer (in this case, a trapeze artist) and the wedding feast.
