= Living skeleton =

Sideshow performers

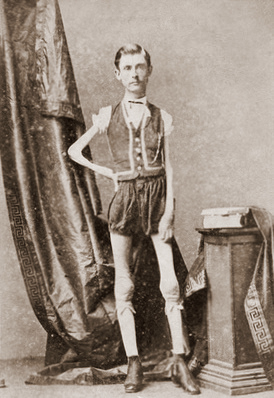
Isaac W. Sprague, billed as a "living human skeleton"

A living skeleton, or thin man, was a common sideshow act or dime museum exhibit. Like most sideshow acts, they were displayed under a multitude of titles, including in this case "human skeleton", "skeleton dude", and "cigarette fiend". The act, which first appeared in the 18th century, peaked in the early 19th, and fell out of popularity in the late 19th and early 20th century.

Unlike contemporary hunger artists, living skeletons usually claimed to eat normally. Advertisements often emphasized their overall health, in contrast to their emaciated appearance.

Nearly all living skeletons were male. Circus managers often arranged for living skeletons to marry fat ladies as a publicity stunt.

Sideshow historian Daniel P. Mannix writes that living skeletons were less popular as attractions than fat people.

Professional living skeletons included:

- Isaac W. Sprague (1841–1887)
- Artie Atherton (1890–1920)
- John Rogan (1867–1905)
- Peter Robinson (1874–1947)
- Claude-Ambroise Seurat (1798–?)
- James W. Coffey (1852–?)
- John Battersby
- Harry V. Lewis (1895–?)
- Alexander Montarg
- Eddie Masher (1896–1962)
- Slim Curtis
- Arthur Barnes
- Walter L. Cole
- D. J. Major
