= Peter Robinson (sideshow artist) =

Sideshow performer

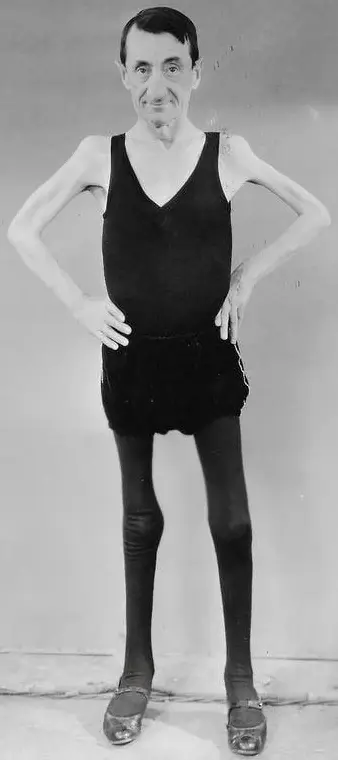
- Robinson c. 1932
- Born: April 8, 1874; Chicopee, Massachusetts, United States
- Died: August 30, 1947 (aged 73); Agawam, Massachusetts, United States
- Other name: The Living Skeleton
- Occupations: Sideshow performer; vaudevillian; theatre performer; film actor
- Spouse: Baby Bunny Smith (m. 1916)

Peter Robinson (April 8, 1874 – August 30, 1947); credited professionally as The Living Skeleton or as The Cigarette Fiend and The Thin Man) was an American theater and sideshow art performer and vaudevillian perhaps best known for his only film appearance in the Tod Browning cult film Freaks, with a lengthy career in the carnival circus circuit at Coney Island and with Ringling Bros. He also appeared briefly on Broadway.

He worked as a carnival sideshow entertainer, weighing in at 58 pounds (26 kg). He had a career in that genre in the vein of circus thin man Isaac W. Sprague and Artie Atherton. He was married to fellow sideshow entertainer Baby Bunny Smith, a 467-pound (212 kg) circus fat lady. He married her numerous times for promotional purposes. He was also purported to be an expert harmonica player.

== Early and personal life ==
Robinson was born in Chicopee, Massachusetts, on April 8, 1874. He was the son of Abraham Robinson, a native of Vermont, and Canadian Victoria Hebert. In later records he used April 6 as his birthday and gave Springfield, Massachusetts, as his place of birth, but the birth registry gives the former date and location. His parents were born in the United States but were of Canadian ancestry. He said that he had a normal childhood and appearance until his early teens, when his weight began to drop precipitously.

In 1924, Robinson married fellow sideshow entertainer Baby Bunny Smith, leading The Macon News to run the headline "Fat Lady and Skeleton Wed".

Robinson died on August 30, 1947, in Agawam, Massachusetts, aged 73.
