= Francis O'Connor =

Francis O'Connor may refer to:

- Francisco Burdett O'Connor (Francis O'Connor, 1791–1871), officer in the Irish Legion of Simón Bolívar's army in Venezuela
- Frank O'Connor (actor, born 1897) (Charles Francis O'Connor, 1897–1979), American actor, painter and rancher and the husband of novelist Ayn Rand
- Francis P. O'Connor (1927–2007), associate judge of the Massachusetts Supreme Judicial Court
- Francis V. O'Connor (1937–2017), American art historian
- Francis K. O'Connor, Commissioner of the New Jersey Department of Transportation since 2024

== See also ==
- Frank O'Connor (disambiguation)
- Frances O'Connor (born 1967), English-born Australian actress
- Frances O'Connor (performer) (1914–1982), American entertainer
