= Elizabeth Greene =

Elizabeth Greene may refer to:

- Liz Greene (born 1946), American-British astrologer, psychologist, and author
- Elizabeth Greene (alpine skier) (1941–2023), Canadian alpine skier
- Elizabeth Plunket Greene (1899–1978), English crime novelist
- Lizzy Greene (born 2003), American actress
- Betty Greene, (1920–1997), American pilot

== See also ==
- Elizabeth Green (disambiguation)
