= Claude-Ambroise Seurat =

French sideshow performer known for being extremely thin

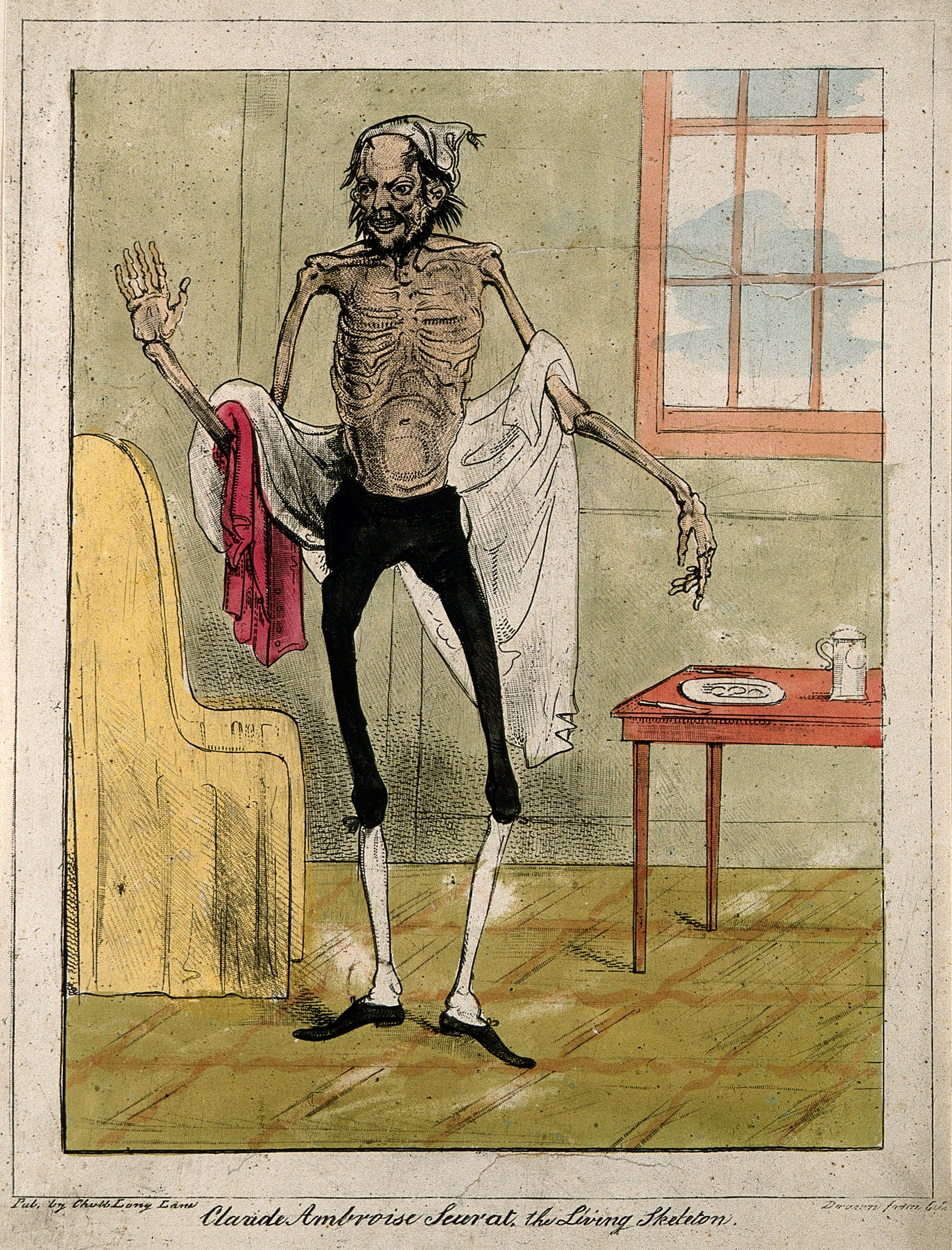
- Born: Variously listed as: 10 April 1797; 4 April 1798; Troyes, France
- Died: after 1833
- Other names: Anatomical Man; The Living Human Skeleton
- Occupation: Freak show attraction
- Known for: being extraordinarily underweight
- Height: Variously given as: 5 ft 3 in (1.60 m) in 1832; 5 ft 7 in (1.70 m) in 1825; 5 ft 7 1/2 in (1.71 m)

Claude-Ambroise Seurat (10 April 1797 or 4 April 1798 – after 1833) was a French fairground performer from Troyes. He appeared in sideshows and was termed "the anatomical man or the living skeleton" (French: l'homme anatomique ou le squelette vivant) because of his exceptionally low body weight; his case also attracted medical and teratological interest.

== Life ==
The date of Seurat's birth is uncertain, being variously reported as either 10 April 1797 or 4 April 1798. Seurat's tours across Europe aroused controversy and because of the publicity, there was extensive interest in his life, particularly from the medical establishment. An account, for instance, cited that Seurat was born healthy and was normal like other children except for his depressed chest.

By age 14, his health dwindled so that his frame already became skeletal in form. When he visited London for a tour in 1825, Seurat was described as having normal height, being between 5 ft 7 in (1.70 m) and 5 ft 7 1/2 in (1.71 m), but with an emaciated body; at the time, he weighed 78 pounds (35.4 kg). His upper arm circumference was 4 inches (10 cm) and his waist measured less than 24 inches (61 cm) around, while his neck was short, flat, and broad.

Later, in 1832, he was stated to have weighed 43 French pounds and was 5 ft 3 in (1.60 m) tall. Seurat's last recorded performance was in 1833 at Dinan in Brittany.

Seurat was also the subject of an anatomical drawing of Francisco Goya after the Spanish painter met him in 1826 at a circus in Bordeaux.

The date of Seurat's death is unknown. In 1868, Gilbert Richard Redgrave commented: "I have not yet been able to ascertain the date of his death. Who knows whether the poor fellow may not still be going the round of the French fairs?"

After his death it was discovered that a tapeworm had been depriving Seurat of nutrition.
