= Freaks (1932 film) =

1932 American horror film by Tod Browning

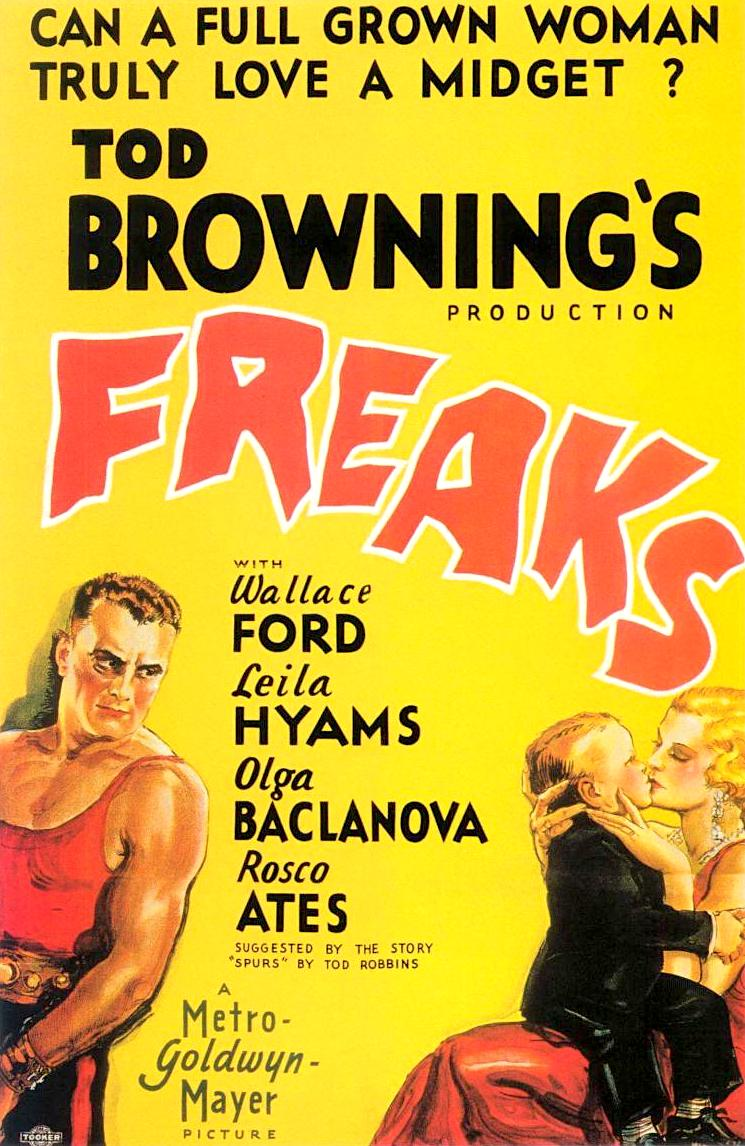
- 1932 theatrical release poster
- Directed by: Tod Browning
- Screenplay by: Willis Goldbeck; Leon Gordon
- Based on: "Spurs"; 1923 short story in Munsey's Magazine by Tod Robbins
- Produced by: Tod Browning; Harry Rapf (uncredited); Irving Thalberg (uncredited)
- Starring: Wallace Ford; Leila Hyams; Olga Baclanova; Roscoe Ates
- Cinematography: Merritt B. Gerstad
- Edited by: Basil Wrangell
- Production company: Metro-Goldwyn-Mayer
- Distributed by: Metro-Goldwyn-Mayer
- Release date: February 12, 1932
- Running time: 64 minutes
- Country: United States
- Languages: English; German; French
- Budget: ~ $310,000 (Note: Sources regarding the budget of Freaks vary: According to film scholar Gregory William Mank, the final budget, down to cents, was $310,607.37. However, Louis B. Mayer biographer Scott Eyer notes a $316,000 budget for the film. A report from Variety in October 1947 lists a higher budget, claiming $350,000.)
- Box office: $341,000

Freaks (also re-released as The Monster Story, Forbidden Love, and Nature's Mistakes) is a 1932 American pre-Code horror drama film produced and directed by Tod Browning, starring Wallace Ford, Leila Hyams, Olga Baclanova, and Roscoe Ates.

Freaks, originally intended as a vehicle for Lon Chaney, is set amongst the backdrop of a travelling French circus and follows a conniving trapeze artist who joins a group of carnival sideshow performers with a plan to seduce and murder a dwarf in the troupe to gain his inheritance. However, her plot proves to have dangerous consequences. The film is based on elements from the short story "Spurs" by Tod Robbins, first published in Munsey's Magazine in February 1923, with the rights being purchased by Metro-Goldwyn-Mayer (MGM). Cedric Gibbons, a childhood friend of Robbins and MGM art department chief, was responsible for the purchase.

Filmed in Los Angeles in the fall of 1931, some employees at MGM were discomfited by the presence of the actors portraying the "freaks" on set, and, other than the so-called more normal looking "freaks", the conjoined twins and the Earles, the performers were not allowed to be on the studio lot, relegated instead to a specially-built tent. The film had test screenings in January 1932, with many members of the audience reacting negatively, finding the film too grotesque. In response to this, MGM executive Irving Thalberg, without consent of director Browning, edited the original 90-minute feature, which was significantly cut, with additional alternate footage incorporated to help increase the running time. The final abridged cut of the film, released in February 1932, was 64 minutes; the original version no longer exists.

Freaks made its world premiere at the Fox Theatre in San Diego, shown in full, without the subsequent cuts from January 28 and had a successful run. The theatre advertised the fact that it was the only place where the movie could be seen in the "original uncensored version".

Despite the cuts made to the film, Freaks still garnered notice for the portrayal of its eponymous characters by people who worked as sideshow performers and had real disabilities. These cast members included dwarf siblings Harry and Daisy Earles; Johnny Eck, who had sacral agenesis; the conjoined twin sisters Daisy and Violet Hilton; and Schlitzie, a man with microcephaly. Because of its controversial content, the film was banned in the United Kingdom for over 30 years, and was labelled as "brutal and grotesque" in Canada.

Though it received critical backlash and was a box-office failure upon initial release, Freaks was subject to public and critical reappraisal in the 1960s, as a long forgotten Hollywood classic, particularly in Europe, and was screened at the 1962 Venice Film Festival. In retrospect, numerous film critics have suggested that the film presents a starkly sympathetic portrait of its sideshow characters rather than an exploitative one, with Andrew Sarris declaring Freaks one of the "most compassionate" films ever made. Nonetheless, critics have continued to take note of the film's horror elements; in 2009, Joe Morgenstern proclaimed that Freaks contains some of the most terrifying scenes in film history. Film scholars have interpreted the film as a metaphor for class conflict, reflecting the Great Depression, and it has been studied for its portrayal of people with disabilities, with theorists arguing that it presents an anti-eugenics message. The film has been highly influential, has become a cult classic, and, in 1994, was selected for preservation by the United States National Film Registry, which seeks to preserve films that are "culturally, historically, or aesthetically significant".

== Plot ==
A beautiful and conniving trapeze artist named Cleopatra seduces a carnival sideshow dwarf named Hans after learning of his large inheritance. This is much to the chagrin of Frieda, his fiancée, also a dwarf. Cleopatra also conspires with circus strongman Hercules to kill Hans so she will inherit his wealth. Meanwhile, other romances flourish among the sideshow performers: the Bearded Lady, who is in love with the Human Skeleton, gives birth to their daughter. The news is spread among the friends by the Stork Woman. Additionally, Violet, a conjoined twin whose sister Daisy is married to Roscoe, the stuttering circus clown, becomes engaged to the circus's owner.

Hans, enamored with Cleopatra, ultimately marries her. At their wedding Cleopatra begins poisoning Hans's wine but drunkenly kisses Hercules in front of Hans, revealing her affair, as the other entertainers are busy celebrating. Dwarf Angeleno leads the "freaks" in an initiation ceremony for Cleopatra, to Hercules's amusement. When he offers her the ceremonial wine cup, Cleopatra refuses it in disgust and drives them away, then berates Hans and drunkenly parades him around on her shoulders like a child. Hans realizes that he has been played for a fool and rejects Cleopatra's attempts to apologize, but then he falls ill from the poison. While bedridden, Hans apologizes to Cleopatra and appears to take the poisoned medicine that she is giving him, but secretly plots with the other entertainers.

In the film's climax, Hans confronts Cleopatra with three of the entertainers as backup thugs. However, Hans's circus wagon is overturned in a storm, giving Cleopatra the chance to escape into the forest, closely pursued by them. At the same time, Hercules goes to kill sea lion trainer Venus for knowing about the plot. Venus's boyfriend, Phroso the clown, attempts to stop Hercules but is nearly killed before the rest of them intervene and injure Hercules, saving Phroso. They all pursue an injured Hercules.

The freaks capture Cleopatra. Some time later, she performs at a carnival as a grotesque "human duck", with her legs cut off and one eye gouged out. In the original version of the film, Hercules also appears afterward as a castrato singer.

While some versions end on Cleopatra as the human duck, another ending shows Hans, now living in a mansion from his inheritance and still humiliated, visited by Phroso, Venus and Frieda. Frieda tells Hans she knows he just wanted to demand the bottle of poison from Cleopatra, not to mutilate her, and not to blame himself for what happened; and that she still loves him. The two then share a heartwarming hug.

== Cast ==
- Wallace Ford as Phroso
- Leila Hyams as Venus
- Olga Baclanova as Cleopatra
- Rosco Ates as Roscoe
- Henry Victor as Hercules
- Harry Earles as Hans
- Daisy Earles as Frieda
- Rose Dione as Madame Tetrallini
- Daisy and Violet Hilton as the Siamese twins
- Schlitzie as himself (Note: alternate spelling Schlitze) and Samuel Whiskers
- Josephine Joseph as Half Woman-Half Man
- Johnny Eck as Half-Boy
- Frances O'Connor as Armless girl
- Peter Robinson as Human skeleton
- Olga Roderick as Bearded lady
- Koo Koo as herself
- Prince Randian as The Living Torso
- Martha Morris as Angeleno's armless wife
- Elvira Snow as Pinhead Pip
- Jenny Lee Snow as Pinhead Zip
- Elizabeth Green as Bird Girl
- Angelo Rossitto as Angeleno
- Edward Brophy and Matt McHugh as the Rollo Brothers

== Analysis and themes ==
=== Class conflict ===
Film critic Melvin Matthews has interpreted Freaks within the context of the Great Depression, writing that it "is essentially a story of the little people (average Americans) versus the big people (the rich and businessmen). The film makes it clear that the big people, personified by Cleopatra and Hercules, scorn the Freaks. Such a disdainful attitude was reflected in the real-life social outlook of some business tycoons during the Depression." Film studies academic Jennifer Peterson similarly identifies Freaks as an example of an "outsider film". Historian Jane Nicholas suggests that the film's conclusion, in which the circus performers mutilate Cleopatra whilst chanting "one of us", is reinforcing the freaks' social currency: "It is interesting that a statement that reads as one of inclusion is often cited as one that embodies horror in the film. What does it mean to be 'one of us'? The chilling horror of the chant 'one of us' reveals why the freak show persists."

In the book Midnight Movies (1991), critics J. Hoberman and Jonathan Rosenbaum compare Freaks to Gold Diggers of 1933, writing that the former is "almost literally dealing with the same thing [class disparity]...but more directly—because the end product isn't just putting on a show, but slaves breaking their chains and triumphing over their masters. Freaks is asking a Depression audience to identify not with the Beautiful People, but with sideshow mutations, a total underclass."

John Stanley, longtime publisher of the San Francisco Chronicle, describes the film as "A Classic of the Grotesque" in Creature Features.

=== Disability and eugenics ===
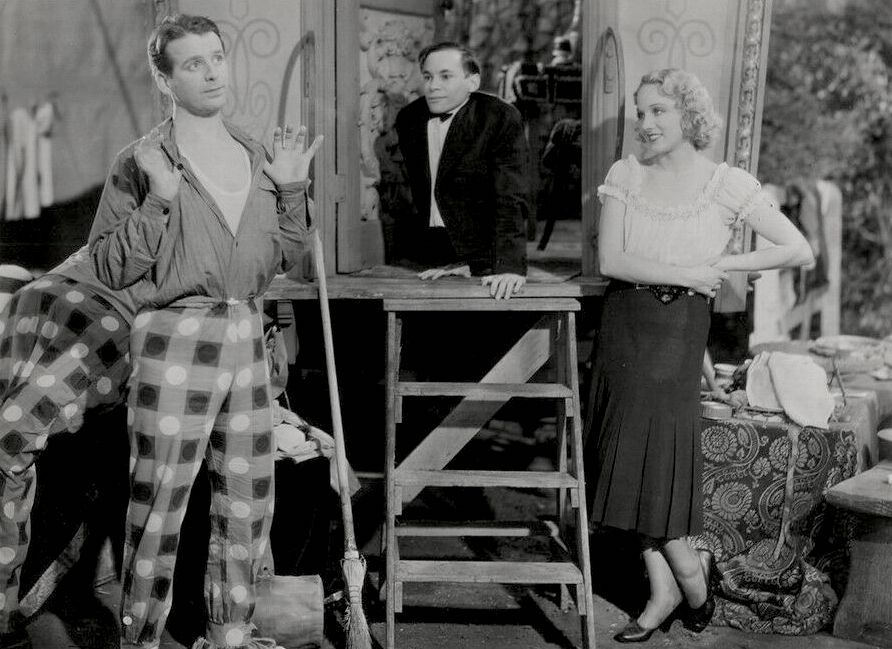
Critic Jon Towlson notes that the everyday interaction between the able-bodied and disabled circus performers serves to uphold an anti-eugenics sentiment.

The film's depiction of people with disabilities has been a significant point of analysis amongst film critics and scholars. In his book Subversive Horror Cinema: Countercultural Messages of Films from Frankenstein to the Present (2014), critic Jon Towlson proposes that Freaks exemplifies an anti-eugenics sentiment. In presenting this idea, Towlson cites vignette sequences that make up the beginning of the film, largely consisting of the freaks in the context of their sideshow, before Browning "begins to undercut the voyeuristic aspects of the traditional freakshow by showing the freaks engaged in the activities of everyday life, dispelling the initial shock and revulsion, and encouraging the viewer to see the freaks as individuals who have overcome their disabilities."

Towlson also notes that the freaks' everyday interactions with the able-bodied sideshow performers, such as Phroso, Roscoe, and Venus, who treat the freaks as equals and friends, further blurs the distinction between the able-bodied and disabled members of the circus, and that the physically beautiful characters—such as trapeze artist Cleopatra—are the ones who are vindictive, supremacist, and immoral. He further argues that the implied sexuality in the film—such as the implication that the conjoined twin sisters (played by Daisy and Violet Hilton) carry on their own separate sex lives—is an affront to the eugenic stance against reproduction and sexual activity among the "physically unfit." Towlson ultimately concludes that this subversion of character exemplifies a stark opposition to the core belief of eugenics, which is that physical appearance is equated with internal worth.

Angela Smith, a scholar of film and disability, similarly notes that Freaks presents numerous scenes in which the freaks engage in routine and ordinary domestic behavior. Among them, Smith cites the freaks' celebration of the birth of the Bearded Lady's baby, and the film's key dinner party sequence in which Cleopatra grows enraged when the freaks sing "We accept her, we accept her, one of us, one of us" as a welcoming song. Film scholars Martin Norden and Madeleine Cahill, however, question Browning's intention of the film's final revenge sequence, in which the freaks mutilate the able-bodied, morally cruel Cleopatra. "The implications of the violence against [Cleopatra] are far from clear," they write. "Members of a traditionally disempowered minority use their collective force to disempower a majority member—turn her into one of them, in effect—leading us to wonder if she is truly disempowered or empowered in a new way. Browning's ambiguity on this point only enhances the film's unsettling properties."

=== Status as a horror film ===
Some critics, such as John Thomas and Raymond Durgnat, have noted that Freaks does not fully embody the genre. Thomas wrote in Film Quarterly that Freaks would "disappoint no one but the mindless children who consume most horror films.... Certainly it is macabre.... But the point is that Freaks is not really a horror film at all, though it contains some horrifying sequences." Durgnat made a similar observation, writing that, like the films of Luis Buñuel, its shock value "mingles with moments which seem shallow, but by the end of the film one begins to catch their mood, a calm, cold combination of guignol and eerily matter-of-fact."

Film-studies scholar Joan Hawkins describes the evolution of how the film's genre was perceived, noting that it "started as a mainstream horror film that migrated into the exploitation arena before finally being recuperated as an avant-garde or art project." Hawkins notes that Browning inverts the audience's expectations, demonstrating that it is "the ordinary, the apparently normal, the beautiful which horrify—the monstrous and distorted which compel our respect, our sympathy, ultimately our affection." Smith writes that the inclusion of Freaks within the horror genre "forces our reconsideration of the genre's status [and] challenges readings in which all horror movies are seen to use monstrous bodies to the same effects." Film theorist Eugenie Brinkema suggests that Freaks functions as a horror film "not because Cleo is mutilated and Hercules killed, all lightning and dark shadows—no, Freaks is a horror film because the gaze itself is horrific, because locating the gaze is a work in terror."

== Production ==
=== Development ===
Metro-Goldwyn-Mayer (MGM) had purchased the rights to Tod Robbins's short story "Spurs" in the mid-1920s at Tod Browning's urging for a reported $8,000. Harry Earles, a dwarf who had appeared in Browning's The Unholy Three (1925)—and who would ultimately star as Hans in Freaks—had originally proposed the idea of making a film version of "Spurs" to Browning. The studio agreed to hire Browning to direct the project based on his past success at Universal Pictures with Dracula (1931) and for his collaborations with Lon Chaney.

In June 1931, MGM production supervisor Irving Thalberg offered Browning the opportunity to direct Arsène Lupin with John Barrymore. Browning declined, preferring to develop Freaks, a project he had started as early as 1927; Browning had worked with a traveling carnival prior to becoming a filmmaker. Screenwriters Willis Goldbeck and Elliott Clawson were assigned to the project at Browning's request. Leon Gordon, Edgar Allan Woolf, Al Boasberg and an uncredited Charles MacArthur would also contribute to the script. The script was shaped over five months. Little of the original story was retained beyond the marriage between a dwarf and an average-sized woman and their wedding feast, and the setting—originally France—was relocated to the United States. Both Thalberg and Harry Rapf served as uncredited co-producers on the film.

=== Casting ===
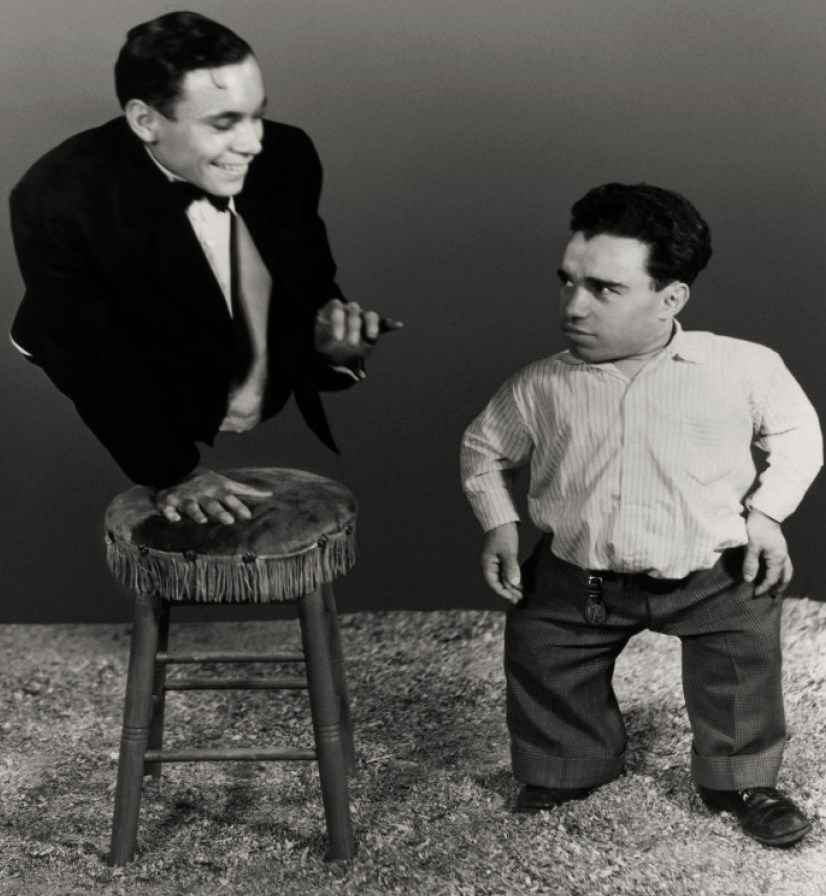
Johnny Eck as Half-Boy and Angelo Rossitto as Angeleno

Victor McLaglen was considered for the role of Hercules, while Myrna Loy was initially slated to star as Cleopatra, with Jean Harlow as Venus. Ultimately, Thalberg decided not to cast any major stars in the picture. Instead, Russian actress Olga Baclanova was cast as Cleopatra, based on her success in a Los Angeles-produced stage production of The Silent Witness.

Harry Earles was cast as Hans, the carnival sideshow performer whom Cleopatra attempts to murder for his estate. Earles' real-life sister, Daisy, portrayed his dwarf love interest, Frieda.

Among the supporting characters featured as "freaks", casting agent Ben Piazza scoured the East Coast for over a month and put out advertisements for photographs and screen tests, scouting carnivals and sideshows for Browning; amongst others, a girl with "Elephant skin", "a boy with dog legs", "a giant", "a bunch of pygmies" and the legendary dwarf performer "Mega Mite" didn't make the cut. The cast that would included Peter Robinson ("The Human Skeleton"); Olga Roderick ("The Bearded Lady"); Frances O'Connor and Martha Morris ("armless wonders"); and the conjoined twins Daisy and Violet Hilton. Among the microcephalic characters who appear in the film (and are referred to as "pinheads" throughout) were Zip and Pip (Elvira and Jenny Lee Snow) and Schlitzie, a man named Simon Metz who wore a dress.

Also featured were the intersex Josephine Joseph, with her left-right divided gender; Johnny Eck, the legless man, who was scouted for the role while performing in Montreal; the completely limbless Prince Randian (also known as The Human Torso and miscredited as "Rardion"); Elizabeth Green the Stork Woman; and Koo-Koo the Bird Girl, who had Virchow–Seckel syndrome or bird-headed dwarfism and is most remembered for the scene wherein she dances on the table.

=== Filming ===
Freaks began principal photography in November 1931, (Note: Film historian Gregory William Mank states production began on November 9, 1931, though Thomas Doherty in Pre-Code Hollywood: Sex, Immorality, and Insurrection in American Cinema, 1930–1934 (1999) writes that principal photography began November 2, the same day as Tarzan the Ape Man.) with a 24-day shooting schedule. At the time of the production's beginning, the film had a budget of approximately $209,000, though it would eventually expand to more than $300,000. The film was shot on the MGM studio lot in Culver City, California. Baclanova recalled her time first meeting her co-stars on the set:

Tod Browning, I loved him. He say, "I want to make a picture with you, Olga Baclanova.... Now I show you with whom you are going to play. But don't faint." I say, "Why should I faint?" So he takes me and shows me all the freaks there. First I meet the midget and he adores me because we speak German and he's from Germany. Then he shows me the girl that's like an orangutan; then a man who has a head but no legs, no nothing, just a head and a body like an egg. Then he shows me a boy who walks on his hands because he was born without feet. He shows me little by little and I could not look. I wanted to cry when I saw them. They have such nice faces, but it is so terrible.... Now, after we start the picture, I like them all so much.

During the shoot, the film had already begun to draw disgusted reactions, resulting in MGM segregating the film's cast and crew to a separate cafeteria so that "people could get to eat in the commissary without throwing up." Filming was completed on December 16, 1931, and Browning began retakes on December 23.

== Release ==
In January 1932, MGM held test screenings of the film, which proved disastrous: Art director Merrill Pye recalled that "Halfway through the preview, a lot of people got up and ran out. They didn't walk out. They ran out." Others reportedly became ill, or fainted; one woman who attended the screening threatened to sue MGM, claiming the film had caused her to suffer a miscarriage. Due to the extremely unfavorable response, the studio cut the picture down from its original 90-minute running time to just over an hour. Much of the sequence of the circus entertainers attacking Cleopatra as she lies under a lightning-struck tree was removed, as well as a sequence showing Hercules being castrated and made into a castrato, a number of comedy sequences, and most of the film's original epilogue, which included Hercules singing in a falsetto (a reference to his castration) with Cleopatra quacking along. These excised sequences are considered lost. In order to pad the running time after these cuts, a new prologue featuring a carnival barker was added, as was the alternate epilogue featuring the reconciliation of the dwarf lovers.

The truncated version—now only 64 minutes long—had its premiere at the Fox Criterion in Los Angeles on February 12, 1932. Regionally, the film attracted controversy upon its theatrical release, and was pulled from screenings in Atlanta. MGM's policy at the time was to not release weak or doubtful films in New York until most of the high spots had been played out of town, so the film did not open there until the summer, opening on July 8, 1932 at the Rialto. In the United Kingdom, the film was banned by the British censors, and remained as so for more than 30 years before being passed with an X rating in August 1963.

=== Box office ===
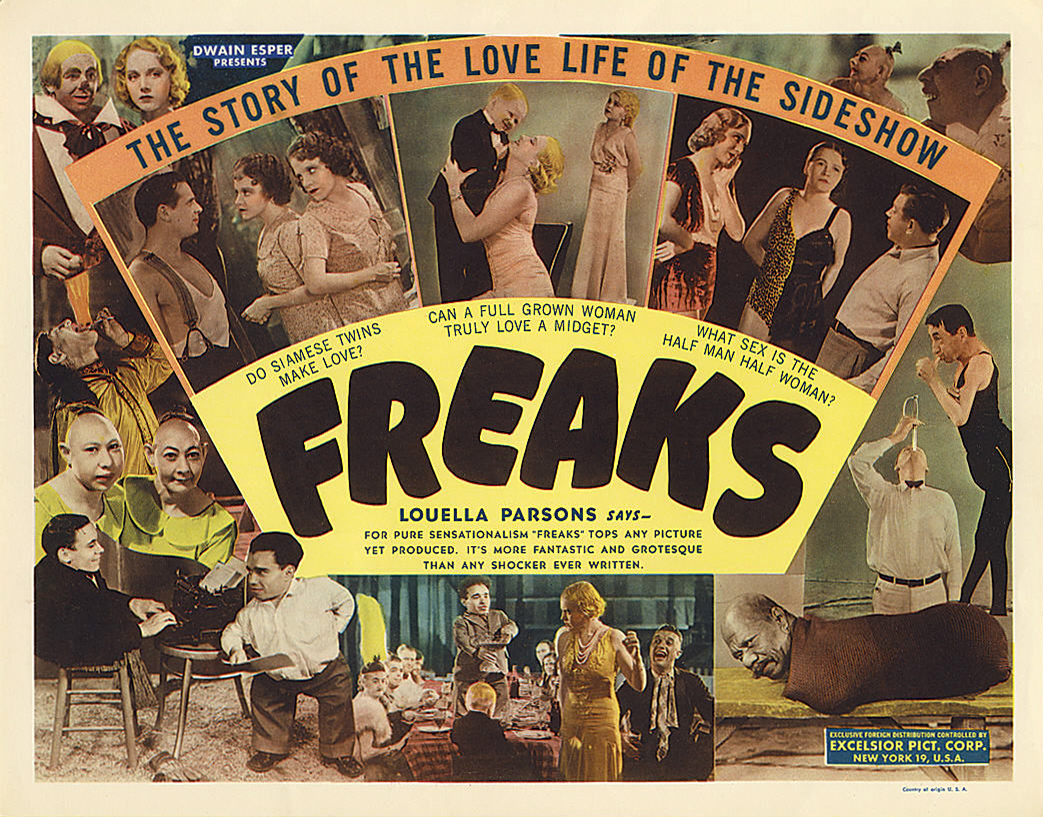
Freaks lobby card

Freaks was unsuccessful at the box office, grossing $289,000 in the United States, and $52,000 internationally, recording a total loss of $164,000. Though not a financial success, the film had astonishingly variable results with greater earnings in smaller cities such as Cincinnati, Boston, and Saint Paul than it did in larger metropolitan cities such as Los Angeles or Chicago.

== Critical response ==
=== Contemporaneous ===
What about the Siamese twins—have they no right to love? The pin-heads, the half-man, half-woman, the dwarfs! They have the same passions, joys, sorrows, laughter as normal human beings. Is such a subject untouchable?

— 1932 press release from MGM responding to accusations that the film exploited its subjects

Despite the extensive cuts, the film was still negatively received by moviegoers, and remained an object of extreme controversy amongst the public upon initial release. Critics' responses were also divided. MGM attempted to address criticisms of exploitation by promoting the film as one compassionate toward its subjects, with tagline such as "What about abnormal people? They have their lives, too!" At the time of its release, the film was regarded by numerous critics as marking the end of Browning's career. Freaks became the only MGM film ever to be pulled from release before completing its domestic engagements, and it was pulled from distribution after its New York engagements concluded in the summer of 1932. Disillusioned by the backlash the film received, MGM studio head Louis B. Mayer sold the distribution rights to Dwain Esper for a 25-year period for $50,000.

A number of reviews were not only highly critical of the film, but expressed outrage and revulsion. Harrison's Reports wrote that "Any one who considers this entertainment should be placed in the pathological ward in some hospital." In The Kansas City Star, John C. Moffitt wrote, "There is no excuse for this picture. It took a weak mind to produce it and it takes a strong stomach to look at it." The Hollywood Reporter called the film an "outrageous onslaught upon the feelings, the senses, the brains and the stomachs of an audience." Variety also published an unfavorable review, writing that the film was "sumptuously produced, admirably directed, and no cost was spared, but Metro heads failed to realize that even with a different sort of offering the story is still important. Here the story is not sufficiently strong to get and hold the interest, partly because interest cannot easily be gained for too fantastic a romance." The review went on to state that the story "does not thrill and at the same time does not please, since it is impossible for the normal man or woman to sympathize with the aspiring midget. And only in such a case will the story appeal."

While a significant number of reviews were unfavorable, the film was well-received by some: The New York Times called it "excellent at times and horrible, in the strict meaning of the word, at others" as well as "a picture not to be easily forgotten." The New York Herald Tribune wrote that it was "obviously an unhealthy and generally disagreeable work," but that "in some strange way, the picture is not only exciting, but even occasionally touching." Columnist Louella Parsons wrote an enthusiastic report on the film, noting that "for pure sensationalism, Freaks tops any pictures yet produced.... In Freaks there are monstrosities such as never before have been known. If you are normal go and see them for yourself, if not, well, use your own judgment."

John Mosher of The New Yorker wrote a favorable review, calling it "a little gem" that "stands in a class by itself, and probably won't be forgotten in a hurry by those who see it." He found its "perfectly plausible story" a key to the effectiveness of its horror, writing that "It's a chilling notion to imagine these weird beings, with their own lives and vanities and passions, all allied in a bitter enmity against us." Addressing the controversial subject matter, Mosher stated: "if the poor things themselves can be displayed in the basement of Madison Square Garden, pictures of them might as well be shown in the Rialto. They may hereafter even be regarded in the flesh with a new dread bordering on respect."

=== Retrospective ===
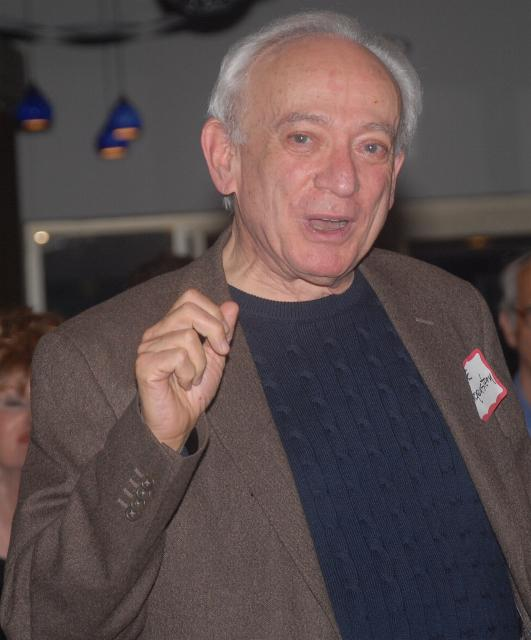
Critic Joe Morgenstern considers Freaks to feature some of the most terrifying scenes in film history.

In the mid/late 20th century, Freaks began to garner critical reassessment after developing a cult following in Europe, and was subject to renewed praise by critics and audiences. The film's growing popularity abroad led to a renewed interest in it among American audiences, and it was subject of a retrospective review in Film Quarterly by John Thomas in 1964, in which he deemed it "a minor masterpiece."

Critic Kim Newman suggests that the film's warmer reception amongst mid/late-20th-century audiences was partly due to the term "freak" having taken on a more positive connotation, as something to be celebrated rather than reviled; Newman also adds that the film "shows obvious fondness for its carny cast." The Los Angeles Times's Mark Chalon Smith declared in a 1995 retrospective review: "Freaks is a wild ride, but it's not the monster-trip some say it is. It is macabre and disturbing, but Browning chose to humanize the deformed characters at the movie's shadowy center, not to demonize them." Nonetheless, the film has still been noted for its stark horror imagery in the 21st century, with Joe Morgenstern writing in 2009 that it boasts "some of the most terrifying scenes ever consigned to film." Jamie Russell of the BBC similarly observed in 2002: "It's easy to see why reactions to the film have been so strong—it's a catalogue of the abnormal, the bizarre, and the grotesque that's still as unsettling today as it was 70 years ago."

Film critic Mark Kermode awarded the film four out of five stars in a 2015 review, noting that, "today, Browning's sympathies are clear; if there are 'freaks' on display here, they are not the versatile performers to whom the title seems to allude." Film theorist and critic Andrew Sarris echoed this sentiment, proclaiming Freaks "one of the most compassionate films ever made." Ed Gonzalez of Slant Magazine wrote in a 2003 retrospective that the film's moral significance has often been obscured by critical attention to its more shocking elements, noting that this "seriously underplay[s] the film's blistering humanity and the audacious aesthetic and philosophical lengths to which Browning goes to challenge the way we define beauty and abnormality."

As of 2021, Freaks holds an approval rating of 95% on the internet review aggregator Rotten Tomatoes, based on 59 reviews, and boasts an average rating of 8.48/10. Its consensus reads, "Time has been kind to this horror legend: Freaks manages to frighten, shock, and even touch viewers in ways that contemporary viewers missed."

=== Home media ===
Freaks was first issued on Beta, VHS, and LaserDisc by MGM/UA Home Video in 1986, and was rereleased on VHS by MGM/UA Home Video in 1990. MGM/UA then issued a remastered LaserDisc in 1993. In 2004, Warner Home Video released the film on DVD, including a commentary track by David J. Skal, the original theatrical disclaimer, a documentary entitled Freaks: The Sideshow Cinema, and a shorter documentary on the film’s various alternate endings. This disc went out of print in 2016. Interviews include film sideshow performers and film historians Todd Robbins and Johnny Meah, and sideshow performer Jennifer Miller and actors Mark Povinelli and Jerry Maren.

Films Around The World (FAT-W) released Freaks on DVD in 2016, and Frolic Pictures released Freaks on a double feature DVD with Browning’s 1931 film Dracula in 2018. However, neither of these discs were authorized releases of either film.

In 2023, The Criterion Collection announced the release of Tod Browning’s Sideshow Shockers, a set which contains new 2K restorations of Freaks, The Unknown and The Mystic. It was released on Blu-ray and DVD on October 17, 2023. David J. Skal recorded a new commentary for this release of Freaks. The Criterion release features all of the extras included in the original Warner DVD Home Video release, in addition to an audio recording of David J. Skal reading Tod Robbins' "Spurs," film stills, a segment called One of Us: Portraits From Freaks, an episode from critic Kristen Lopez's podcast on the film's disability representation, and a booklet containing photos, credits, and critical essays.

== Legacy ==
Freaks is now widely considered among director Browning's best films. The film's growing esteem among critics traces back to the early 1960s, when it was rediscovered as a counterculture cult film, particularly among European audiences. It was screened at the 1962 Venice Film Festival, and shortly after was shown for the first time in the United Kingdom, having been banned there since 1932. Throughout the 1970s and 1980s, the film was regularly shown at midnight movie screenings in the United States. It also enjoyed a critical reappraisal in France during this period, as, according to Hawkins, Browning had achieved a "certain Poe-esque stature among French intellectuals." Critic Derek Malcolm noted in 1999 that the film is "one of the masterpieces of baroque cinema," and a "damning antidote to the cult of physical perfection and an extraordinary tribute to the community of so-called freaks who made up its cast."

In 1994, Freaks was selected for preservation in the United States National Film Registry, which preserves "culturally, historically, or aesthetically significant" films. Film scholar Jennifer Peterson cites Freaks as one of the 50 most important American films ever made. In a 2018 retrospective on Browning's career, Martyn Conterio of the British Film Institute assesses the film as "best approached with a fuller understanding of Browning's work, specifically, the director's emotionally complicated interest in human abnormality and the severely disabled," and considers it among Browning's films that "are pioneering and boundary-pushing, amounting to repeat attacks on Hollywood's standardised images of beauty and glamour." It is also listed in the film reference book 1001 Movies You Must See Before You Die, which says "No mere plot summary can do justice to this alarming yet profound movie, which truly must be seen to be believed. It is a supreme oddity (freak?) of world cinema considered by many to be the most remarkable film in the career of a director whose credits include the original version of Dracula (1931)."

Several sequences in the film have been noted for their lasting cultural impact, particularly the freaks' climactic revenge sequence, which was ranked 15th on Bravo TV's list of the 100 Scariest Movie Moments. The banquet sequence in which the freaks chant "We accept her, we accept her, one of us" has also been noted, with Mike D'Angelo of The A.V. Club describing it as "the film's greatest cultural legacy.... "One of us, one of us, one of us" reliably gets trotted out in situations involving an individual being forced to conform by the masses—I can recall seeing homages on both The Simpsons and South Park, and there are probably dozens of others out there."

Freaks has inspired two unofficial remakes: She Freak (1967) and Freakshow (2007). It also served as a major inspiration for the fourth season of the television series American Horror Story, titled Freak Show (2014–2015). Freaks was adapted into a 1992 comic book series, published by Fantagraphics, written by Jim Woodring and illustrated by Francisco Solano Lopez.

== In popular culture ==
Browning and the film are mentioned in the 1974 David Bowie song "Diamond Dogs".

The song "Pinhead" (1977) by the punk-rock band Ramones was inspired by Freaks, which the band saw in Cleveland, Ohio, after their gig was cancelled. Joey Ramone's brother Mickey Leigh said that the line "Gabba Gabba, we accept you, we accept you one of us" was specifically taken from the scene in which "the midget groom does a dance on the banquet table and sings 'Gooble gobble, we accept you, one of us' to his bride." The song is an audience participation song, and during live performances, Leigh used to run out on stage with a big sign that bore the text "Gabba Gabba, Hey" and pass it to Joey who'd hold it up urging the crowd to join in. The song was featured on their album Leave Home.

The Ramones also used an image from the movie on the front cover of their 1986 single, "Somebody Put Something in My Drink".

The professional wrestling stable The Oddities, active in the World Wrestling Federation from 1998-1999, were presented as freak show performers. Their entrance theme and accompanying video featured audio and clips from Freaks, performed by the Insane Clown Posse. The song and video celebrated the film's message, that these "freaks" were decent and earnest and that the so-called "normal" people were bad.

The song "Separated Out" (2001) from the album Anoraknophobia by the UK band Marillion features several samples from the movie.

The final episode of Clerks: The Animated Series features recurring appearances by Pip and Zip, to annoy Dante Hicks and Randal Graves at the QuickStop.

In South Park season 5, episode 14 titled "Butters' Very Own Episode" which first aired on December 12, 2001, Butters' mother Linda attempts to murder him, and believing she succeeded, attempts to cover up her culpability by lying to the media along with her husband Stephen by blaming "some Puerto Rican guy" for his abduction and disappearance. Fellow high-profile suspected murderers at the time O.J. Simpson, John and Patsy Ramsey, and Gary Condit claim that the same "Puerto Rican guy" must have also abducted and killed the individuals for which they were each being blamed, and in doing so, express their support and commiseration for Linda and Stephen by chanting, "One of us, one of us! Gooble gobble, gooble gobble!"

In Final Destination 3, the characters Ian and Erin call each other Zip and Pip in reference to the film.

The film was parodied in the third segment of "Treehouse of Horror XXIV" (2013).

In The Wolf of Wall Street, Jordan Belfort and associates chant 'Gooble gobble, we accept you, one of us' while making plans for a darts tournament that involves throwing little people at a target.

The film was mentioned in the third season episode of The Sopranos, "University," when the character Caitlin expresses disgust at her classmates' callous reaction to characters in the film.

The song "One of Us" (2026), by the horror-based metal project Carlyle Hearse, is based on the film. The song uses audio from the film's iconic feast scene (the lines "We accept her" and "Gooble gobble") for its chorus.

== See also ==
- Disability in horror films
- Carny - another film featuring legitimate sideshow performers
- Shoujo Tsubaki
- List of cult films

== Bibliography ==
- Bombaci, Nancy (2006). Freaks in Late Modernist American Culture: Nathanael West, Djuna Barnes, Tod Browning, and Carson McCullers. New York: Peter Lang. ISBN 978-0-820-47832-6.
- Brinkema, Eugenie (2008). "Browning. Freak. Woman. Stain.". In Herzogenrath, Bernd (ed.). The Cinema of Tod Browning: Essays of the Macabre and Grotesque. Jefferson, North Carolina: McFarland. pp. 158–173. ISBN 978-0-786-43447-3.
- Doherty, Thomas (1999). Pre-Code Hollywood: Sex, Immorality, and Insurrection in American Cinema, 1930–1934. New York: Columbia University Press. ISBN 978-0-231-50012-8.
- Eyman, Scott (2005). Lion of Hollywood: The Life and Legend of Louis B. Mayer. New York: Simon and Schuster. ISBN 978-0-743-20481-1.
- Hartzman, Marc (2006). American Sideshow: An Encyclopedia of History's Most Wondrous and Curiously Strange Performers. New York: Penguin. ISBN 978-1-585-42530-3.
- Hawkins, Joan (1996). "'One of Us': Tod Browning's Freaks". In Thomson, Rosemarie Garland (ed.). Freakery: Cultural Spectacles of the Extraordinary Body. New York: New York University Press. pp. 265–276. ISBN 978-0-814-78222-4.
- Hawkins, Joan (2000). Cutting Edge: Art-Horror and the Horrific Avant-Garde. Minneapolis, Minnesota: University of Minnesota Press. ISBN 978-1-452-90430-6.
- Hoberman, J.; Rosenbaum, Jonathan (1991). Midnight Movies. New York: Da Capo Press. ISBN 978-0-306-80433-5.
- Jensen, Dean (2012). The Lives and Loves of Daisy and Violet Hilton: A True Story of Conjoined Twins. Berkeley, California: Ten Speed Press. ISBN 978-0-307-81477-7.
- Mank, Gregory William (2005). Women in Horror Films, 1940s. Jefferson, North Carolina: McFarland. ISBN 978-0-7864-2335-4.
- Matthews, Melvin E Jr. (2009). Fear Itself: Horror on Screen and in Reality During the Depression and World War II. Jefferson, North Carolina: McFarland. ISBN 978-0-786-44313-0.
- Nicholas, Jane (2018). Canadian Carnival Freaks and the Extraordinary Body, 1900-1970s. Toronto, Ontario: University of Toronto Press. ISBN 978-1-487-52208-7.
- Norden, Martin F.; Cahill, Madeleine (2000). "Violence, Women and Disability in Tod Browning's Freaks and The Devil Doll". In Silver, Alain; Ursini, James (eds.). The Horror Film Reader. New York: Limelight Editions. pp. 151–166. ISBN 978-0-879-10297-5.
- Peterson, Jennifer (2009). "Freaks". In White, John; Haenni, Sabine (eds.). Fifty Key American Films. New York: Routledge. pp. 36–41. ISBN 978-1-135-97932-4.
- Peterson, Jennifer (2014). "Freaks (1932)". In Haenni, Sabine; Barrow, Sarah; White, John (eds.). The Routledge Encyclopedia of Films. New York: Routledge. pp. 234–240. ISBN 978-1-317-68261-5.
- Scheider, Steven Jay (2013). 1001 Movies You Must See Before You Die. Hauppauge, New York: B.E.S. Publishing. ISBN 978-0-7641-6613-6.
- Senn, Bryan (2015). A Year of Fear: A Day-by-Day Guide to 366 Horror Films. Jefferson, North Carolina: McFarland. ISBN 978-1-476-61090-0.
- Skal, David J. (1995). Dark Carnival: The Secret World of Tod Browning—Hollywood's Master of the Macabre. New York: Anchor Books. ISBN 978-0-385-47406-1.
- Smith, Angela (2012). Hideous Progeny: Disability, Eugenics, and Classic Horror Cinema. New York: Columbia University Press. ISBN 978-0-231-52785-9.
- Thomas, John (Spring 1964). "Freaks". Film Quarterly. 17 (3). Berkeley, California: University of California Press: 59–61. doi:10.2307/1210917. JSTOR 1210917. Archived from the original on March 27, 2022.
- Towlson, Jon (2014). Subversive Horror Cinema: Countercultural Messages of Films from Frankenstein to the Present. Jefferson, North Carolina: McFarland. ISBN 978-1-476-61533-2.
- Vieira, Mark A. (2003). Hollywood Horror: From Gothic to Cosmic. New York: Harry N. Abrams. ISBN 0-8109-4535-5.
