= Isaac W. Sprague =

American sideshow performer (1841–1887)

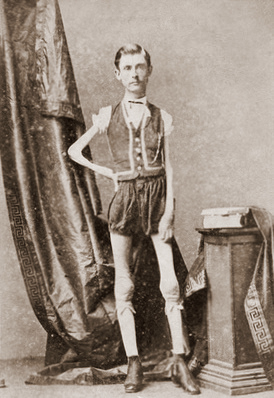
- Sprague in 1867, aged 26
- Born: May 21, 1841; East Bridgewater, Massachusetts, U.S.
- Died: January 5, 1887 (aged 45); Chicago, Illinois, U.S.
- Occupation: Sideshow performer
- Known for: Performing as "The Living Skeleton"
- Spouse: Tamar Moore
- Children: 3

Isaac W. Sprague (May 21, 1841 – January 5, 1887) was an American entertainer and sideshow performer, billed as the living human skeleton.

== Early life ==
He was born on May 21, 1841, in East Bridgewater, Massachusetts.

== Career ==
During early adulthood, Sprague worked as a cobbler for his father and later as a grocer. As his illness progressed, however, he became too weak to continue either occupation. After the deaths of his parents, he was unable to find enough work to support himself and was left unemployed.

In 1865, at age 24, Sprague accepted a position in a circus sideshow, where he was billed as "The Living Skeleton" and "The Original Thin Man". The following year, in 1866, at age 25, P. T. Barnum hired him to perform at Barnum's American Museum. Barnum paid Sprague $80 a week (equivalent to $1,800 today). Sprague later recalled overhearing Barnum remark to an agent, "Pretty lean man, where did you scare him up?"

In 1868, at age 27, Sprague escaped unharmed when Barnum's American Museum was destroyed by fire. After taking time away from exhibition to marry Tamar Moore, Sprague attempted to leave the sideshow business. Financial hardship and his illness prevented him from finding other employment, and he later resumed touring throughout the United States, Canada and England.

== Medical condition ==
Sprague was reportedly healthy throughout childhood until he became ill following a swimming accident at age 12. Although he retained a healthy appetite, he never recovered and continued to lose weight for the rest of his life. As his condition worsened, he became increasingly weak and was eventually unable to continue working as a cobbler or grocer during early adulthood.

By 1885, at age 44, Sprague stood 5 ft 6 in (168 cm) tall but weighed only 43 lb (20 kg). As the disease advanced, he carried a flask of milk around his neck and drank from it throughout the day to help remain conscious.

Later writers have described Sprague's illness as consistent with extreme progressive muscular atrophy, a rare neurological disease that causes muscles to weaken and shrink over time.

== Marriage and family ==
Sprague married Tamar Moore shortly after 1868 and the couple had three sons, all of whom grew up to be healthy and physically normal. Sprague found happiness in his family, stating "Life, that had at times seemed so little worth preserving, now seemed more precious."

== Death ==
He died on January 5, 1887, in poverty, of asphyxia in Chicago, Illinois.

== See also ==
- Artie Atherton
- Peter Robinson - "The Living Skeleton"
