= Ella Smith =

Ella Smith may refer to:

- Ella Gaunt Smith (1868–1932), American doll manufacturer
- Ella May Dunning Smith (1860–1934) American author, composer, and pianist
- Ella-Rae Smith (born 1998), English actress and model
- Ella Smith (actress) (born 1983), Welsh actress
- Ella Smith (footballer, born 2000), Australian rules (AFLW) footballer for West Coast
- Ella Smith (footballer, born 2004), Australian rules (AFLW) footballer for Brisbane and Gold Coast
