= Ellen M. Smith Three-Decker =

- U.S. National Register of Historic Places
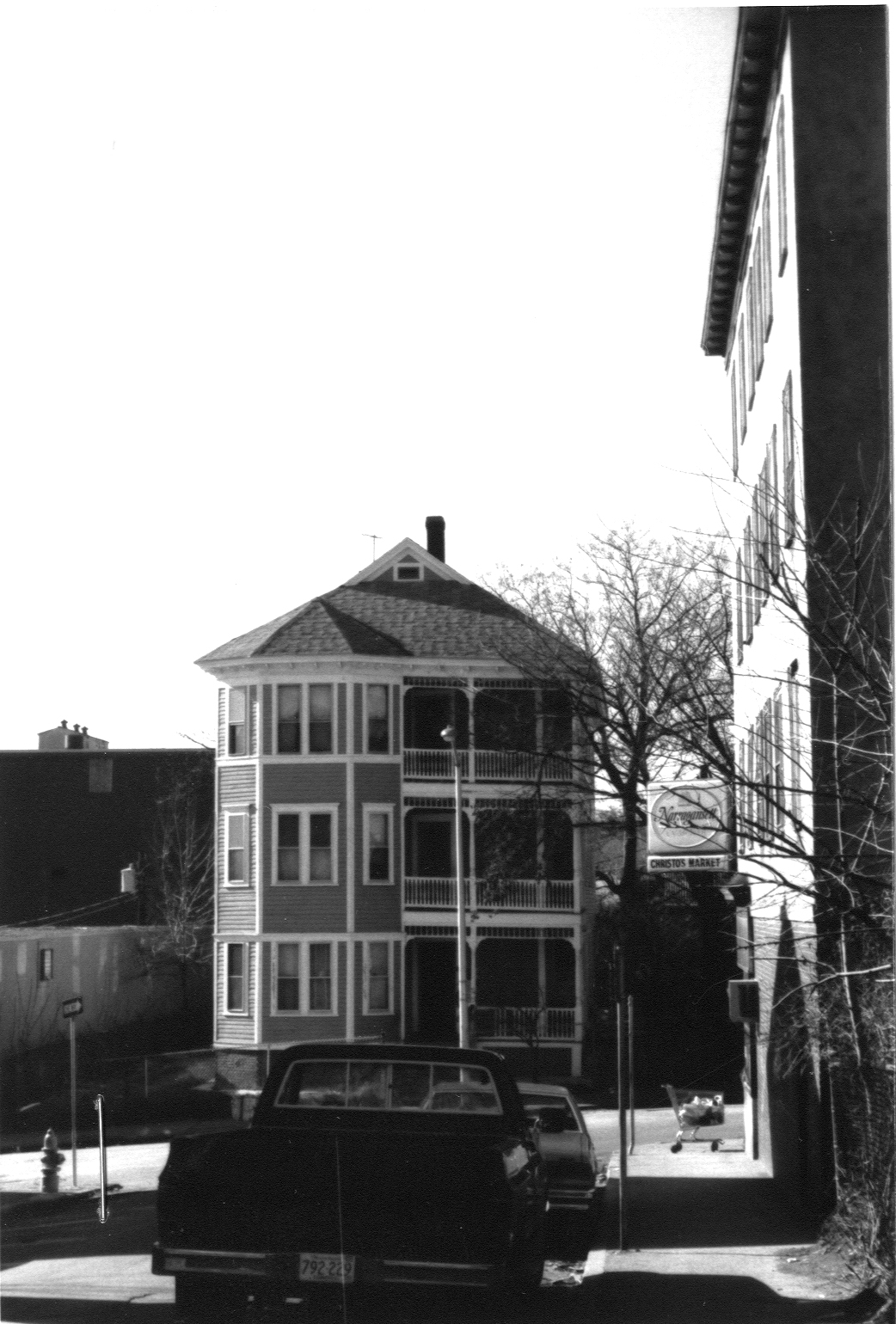
- c. 1981 photo

- Location within Massachusetts Location within the United States
- Location: 22 Kilby St., Worcester, Massachusetts
- Coordinates: 42°15′2″N 71°48′58″W
- Built: 1908
- Architectural style: Queen Anne
- MPS: Worcester Three-Deckers TR
- NRHP reference No.: 89002409
- Added to NRHP: February 9, 1990

The Ellen M. Smith Three-Decker was a historic triple decker house in Worcester, Massachusetts. Built in 1908, it was described as one of the best preserved Queen Anne triple deckers in Worcester University Park area when it was listed on the National Register of Historic Places in 1980. It was also one of the last to be built in the area, part of a group built to house workers in the business growing along the nearby rail corridor. It was thought to be demolished, but was actually relocated and re-modeled near-by.

== See also ==
- National Register of Historic Places listings in southwestern Worcester, Massachusetts
- National Register of Historic Places listings in Worcester County, Massachusetts
