= Elizabeth Green (politician) =

American politician (died 1937)

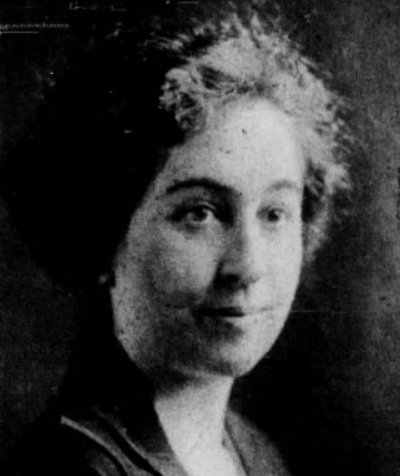
- Green c. 1923

Member of the Connecticut House of Representatives from Tolland
- In office 1923–1925 Serving with George Neff
- Preceded by: Helen Jewett; Edward E. Fuller
- Succeeded by: Frank A. Newman; Samuel Johnson

Personal details
- Born: 1895 or 1896
- Died: January 4, 1937 (aged 41) Hartford, Connecticut, U.S.
- Party: Democratic

Elizabeth L. Green (died January 4, 1937) was an American politician who served in the Connecticut House of Representatives from 1923 to 1925, representing the town of Tolland as a Democrat. She was the second woman to serve in the Connecticut General Assembly as a Democrat.

== Career ==
A Democrat, Green was elected to the Connecticut House of Representatives in 1922 as one of two representatives from the town of Tolland. Green served her term alongside fellow Democrat George Neff and did not run for reelection in 1924.

While serving in the House, Green was clerk of the public health and safety committee.

Green was the second woman to represent Tolland and the second woman to serve as a Democrat in the General Assembly, in both cases succeeding the first, Helen Jewett, who was in office from 1921 to 1923.

Outside of her political career, Green worked as a schoolteacher.

== Death ==
Green died on January 4, 1937, in Hartford, Connecticut. She was 41.
