= Beth Green (photographer) =

American photographer

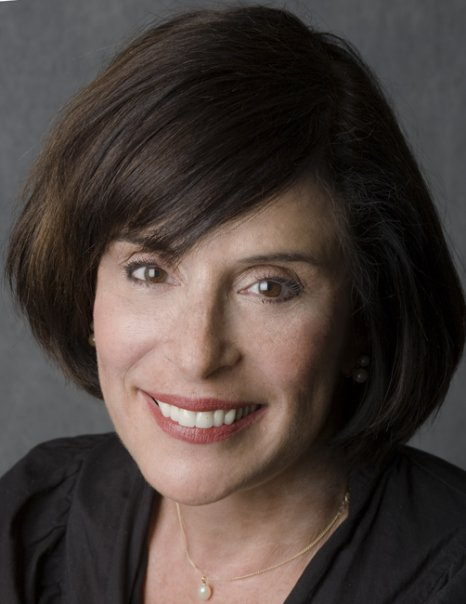
- Born: 1949 (age 76–77)
- Occupation: photographer
- Notable work: Successful Self-Promotion for Photographers

Beth S. Green (born 1949) is an American photographer based in New York City. She is the owner of Beth Green Studios, Inc. After many years of experience in photojournalism, Green currently works as an instructor for the New York Institute of Photography, where she teaches and reviews the works of students. She is a licensed teacher with the NYIP. She was a photo editor for Newsweek prior to the establishment of her independent studio.

== Notable moments and achievements ==
Green photographed Congressman Charles Rangel, who used her portrait as his official photograph for many years, and Eric R. Dinallo, the former New York Insurance Commissioner. Green was the first female photographer allowed in a professional sports locker room. Following the 1976 litigation over the issue of female reporters gaining access to men’s locker rooms, Green, then a freelancer for United Press International, was assigned to cover the Philadelphia Flyers hockey game and shoot the post-game celebration in the locker room, 'becoming the first women photographer to do so'.

Green has been a member of the American Society of Media Photographers (ASMP), since 1971 and a former member of the steering committee for its New York Chapter.

Green has featured in PhotoPro magazine for her expertise in corporate and executive portraits. She was also featured in Photo District News with focus on her skills and techniques in shooting women executive portraits.

Green collaborated with Elyse Weissberg on her book Successful Self-Promotion for Photographers (2004), which featured Green’s work and promotional material.
