= Liz Green (musician) =

- Genres: Blues, folk
- Labels: Humble Soul, PIAS Recordings
- Website: lizgreenmusic.co.uk

Liz Green is an English, Manchester-based, singer-songwriter. In 2007, Green won the Glastonbury Festival Emerging Talent competition. In 2011 she released her debut album, O, Devotion!. In 2012 she recorded a cover of Leonard Cohen's "Sisters of Mercy" for a covers compilation; it was later offered as a download from her website. Her second album Haul Away! was released in 2014. Later that year, she played a radio session on Marc Riley's BBC 6 Music evening show, featuring a cover of David Bowie's "Five Years". Other than a self-distributed 2017 EP, Crow Cries, Green has released no music since.

== Discography ==
=== Albums ===
- O, Devotion! – 14 November 2011, [PIAS]
- Haul Away! – 14 April 2014, [PIAS]

=== Singles ===
- "Bad Medicine" – 20 August 2007, Humble Soul
- "Midnight Blues" – 2008, Humble Soul
- "Displacement Song" – 22 August 2011, [PIAS]
- "Bad Medicine" – 27 February 2012, [PIAS]

=== Compilations ===
- The Abandoned Recordings – 2008
- Shadow Play – 2010, Humble Soul
