= Frances O'Connor (performer) =

American entertainer (1914–1982)

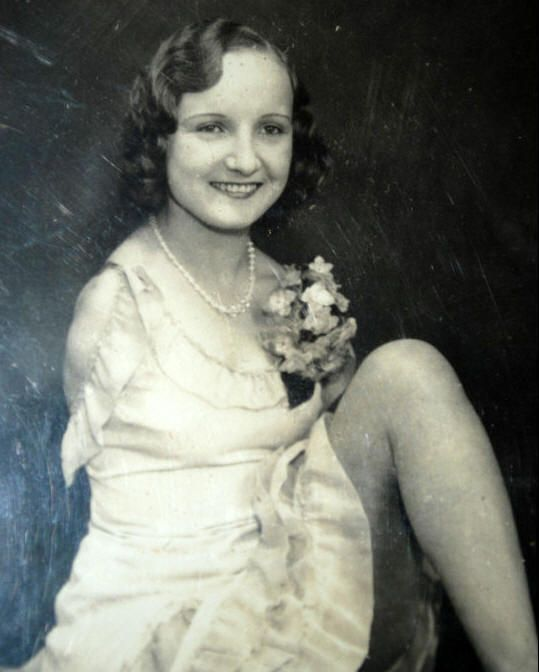
- Born: September 8, 1914; Hawk Creek Township, Renville County, Minnesota, Minnesota
- Died: January 30, 1982 (aged 67); Long Beach, California
- Occupations: Sideshow performer, billed as the living Venus de Milo, film actress

Frances Belle O'Connor (September 8, 1914 – January 30, 1982) was an American entertainer, born without arms and stunted legs, who performed in sideshows and circuses, however was best known for appearing in Tod Browning's cult film Freaks in 1932, alongside another limbless performer, Martha Morris.

== Biography ==
=== Early life ===
O'Connor was born in Hawk Creek Township, Renville Country, Minnesota, to Freddie Lee O'Connor and Emma Josephine Fredrickson. She was born without arms apparently due to her mother having had the German Measles during pregnancy. She had two siblings, Wallace and Dennis.

=== Career ===
O'Connor was billed as "The Armless Wonder" and the living Venus de Milo. She made her living appearing in circus sideshows She also did knitting and sewing with her feet as a hobby. She worked firstly with AI G Circus and then from the mid-1920s to the mid-1940s with Ringling Brothers and Barnum and Bailey travelling circuses.

O'Connor was cast by Ben Piazza in the 1932 pre-code cult film classic Freaks, directed and produced by Tod Browning. She appears opposite Martha Morris (1902–1937), , who was also born without arms and with shortened legs. The film revolves around a group of individuals with physical deformities, predominantly played by real life freak show performers. In the film O'Connor demonstrates how she used her feet to perform everyday activities.
