= Patrick Henry Hughes =

American musician (born 1988)

- Born: March 10, 1988 (age 38)
- Occupations: Student, speaker
- Instruments: Piano, trumpet
- Website: patrickhenryhughes.com

Patrick Henry Hughes (born March 10, 1988) is an American multi-instrumental musician from Louisville, Kentucky who was born without eyes and without the ability to fully straighten his arms and legs, making him unable to walk.

== Biography ==
Patrick Henry Hughes was born March 10, 1988, to Patrick John and Patricia Hughes. Upon his delivery, the medical staff noticed physical anomalies. These were diagnosed as bilateral anophthalmia with pterygium syndrome and congenital bilateral hip dysplasia.

His father, Patrick John Hughes, introduced him to the piano at the age of nine months. Patrick has studied piano in the years since and later began the study of trumpet. He has two younger brothers, Jesse and Cameron.

Patrick Henry's national fame began in 2006 while a student at the University of Louisville. At the suggestion of Louisville's marching band director, Dr. Greg Byrne, Patrick Henry joined the Louisville Marching Band, playing trumpet while his father pushed him in his wheelchair through the marching routines. This visible commitment attracted increasing crowd and media attention throughout the fall football season, and the pair of Patricks were featured in a variety of television and newspaper coverage. Patrick Henry was subsequently invited to play piano and sing in musical performances throughout the country, including two performances at the Grand Ole Opry, and onstage performances with Pam Tillis, Lonestar, Lane Brody, Chad Brock, Faith Hill, and Bryan White. Also in 2007 he played solo trumpet on stage in performance with the Louisville Orchestra.

Hughes graduated from Atherton High School, where he participated in the International Baccalaureate program and was a member of the National Honor Society. He graduated magna cum laude from the University of Louisville, where he majored in Spanish and played trumpet in the marching band.

In November 2007, the members of the Hughes family were chosen to be the recipients of a complete home renovation for the show Extreme Makeover: Home Edition. The episode aired on February 15, 2008.

During late 2012, Patrick Henry and his family competed on Family Feud, remaining champions for four days before being defeated on their fifth and final day; the family was later brought back because of a technical error and given another chance to retire undefeated, but were again unsuccessful.

Patrick Henry Hughes's story was dramatized in the 2015 movie I Am Potential, written and directed by Zach Meiners and starring Jimmy Bellinger as Patrick Henry, and Burgess Jenkins as his father.

== Published works ==
- I Am Potential: Eight Lessons on Living, Loving, and Reaching Your Dreams with Bryant Stamford (ISBN 0738212989; Da Capo Lifelong Books, 2008)

=== Discography ===
- Most Requested From Me to You (2006?)
- Look Within (2009)

== Awards ==
- 2001: Olympic torchbearer, December 17, 2001
- 2001-2005: VSA Arts of Kentucky Young Soloist Award
- 2003, 2006: Breaking Barriers Spotlight Award
- 2005: VSA arts Panasonic Young Soloist International winner
- 2006: Disney Wide World of Sports Spirit Award

== See also ==
- Jessica Cox, motivational speaker and world's first licensed armless pilot.
- Stephen Hawking, theoretical physicist, cosmologist and survivor of ALS.
- Hirotada Ototake, sports writer and survivor of Tetra-amelia syndrome.
- Mile Stojkoski, humanitarian and wheelchair ultramarathon runner.
- Nick Vujicic, motivational speaker and survivor of Tetra-amelia syndrome.
