= Mona Lisa Yuchengco =

Mona Lisa Yuchengco is a Filipino-American community activist, publisher and filmmaker. She was born in Manila, Philippines and moved to San Francisco in 1982 with her two sons. Yuchengco graduated from Assumption College with degrees in Liberal Arts and Education and earned a master's degree in Business Administration from Ateneo University.

In 1992 Yuchengco founded Filipinas, a magazine specifically directed toward the Filipino American community. The magazine, in its prime, covered various topics such as the lack of compensation of Filipino Veterans in World War II, domestic violence and Filipino identity. Yuchengco sold Filipinas in 2005 and it dropped its print version in 2010, existing solely online thereafter. In late 2012 Yuchengco started a new magazine, Positively Filipino, that was solely available on the internet. In 2014 Positively Filipino writers took six Plaridel Awards, boosting the magazine's status.

== Filmmaking career ==
In 2012, Yuchengco produced and directed "Marilou Diaz-Abaya: Filmmaker on a Voyage". The film is a feature documentary film about Marilou Diaz-Abaya, Yuchengco's sister-in-law, who is considered one of the 20th Century's most renowned Filipino film directors. "Filmmaker on a Voyage" screened at the Center for Asian American Media's CAAMFest in 2013. Yuchengco also co-produced the multi-award-winning Right Footed, a feature documentary profile of Filipino-American pilot and disability activist Jessica Cox that was directed by Nick T. Spark. In addition to its long festival run, the film screened in 2016 as part of a fundraiser for Philippine International Aid.

== Community service and awards ==
Yuchengco has been involved in various charities and organizations relating to Asian American interests. In 1986 she founded Philippine International Aid, which she chairs. Among other awards, she was awarded the President's citation by Philippine President Gloria Arroyo December 12, 2002, for her contributions to the Filipino community in the United States.

== Personal life ==
Yuchengco is married to Lloyd LaCuesta and has two sons and several grandchildren. She is the daughter of Alfonso Yuchengco.
