= Jessica Cox =

American armless aviator, scuba diver, and Taekwondo black-belt

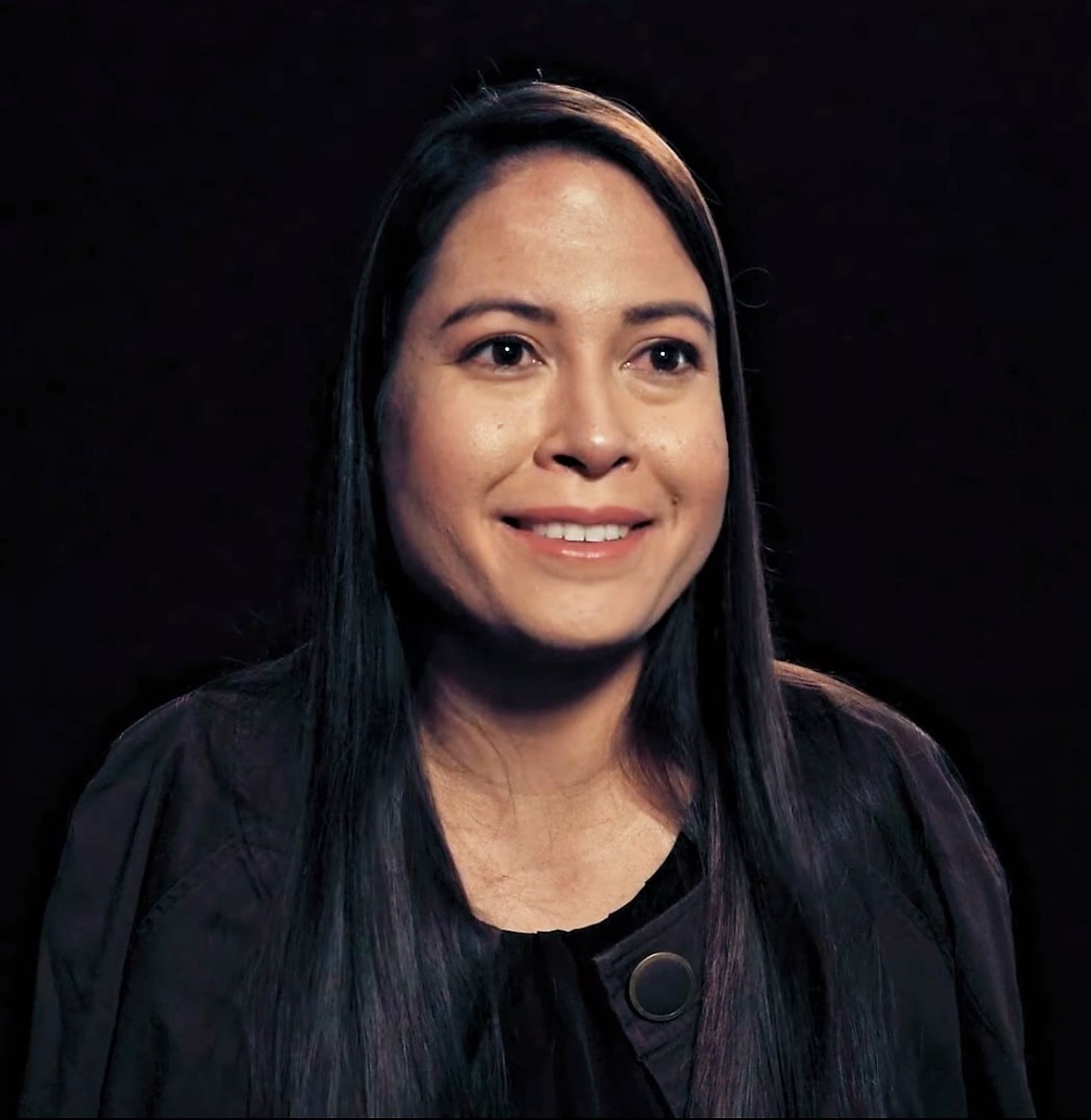
- Cox interviewed by UPROXX in 2017
- Born: February 2, 1983 (age 43); Sierra Vista, Arizona, U.S.
- Other names: In Dodowa; Ghana: Ayerkie Dede
- Education: Bachelor of Science in Psychology
- Alma mater: University of Arizona
- Occupations: motivational speaking; keynote speaker
- Years active: 2004–present
- Employer: Jessica Cox Motivational Services
- Known for: Armless surfing; armless scuba diving; armless Ercoupe pilot; armless Taekwondo
- Notable work: Disarm Your Limits; Right Footed
- Spouse: Patrick Chamberlain
- Awards: Arizona Aviation Hall of Fame, Guinness World Record: The Only Pilot to Fly With Their Feet, Inspiration Awards for Women 2012: Most Aspirational, Tucson Woman of the Year, Honorary Doctorate
- Website: www.jessicacox.com

Jessica Cox (born February 2, 1983) is the world's first licensed armless pilot, as well as the first armless black-belt in the American Taekwondo Association. She was born without arms due to a rare birth defect.

== Early life ==
Jessica Cox graduated from the University of Arizona in 2005 with a bachelor's degree in psychology and a minor in communications.

Cox has not used prosthetic arms since she turned 14. Using her feet as most people use their hands, she is able, among other things, to drive an unmodified car with an unrestricted license, to type on a keyboard at 25 words per minute, to pump her own gas, and to put in and remove her contact lenses. She is also a certified scuba diver.

== Career ==
Jessica Cox flew in a single engine airplane for the first time via Wright Flight in 2004. Jessica earned her pilot's certificate on October 10, 2008 after three years of training and is qualified to fly a light-sport aircraft to altitudes of 10,000 feet. She received her flight training through an Able Flight scholarship and soloed under the instruction of Parrish Traweek.

Cox's Sport Pilot Certificate is for an ERCO 415-C Ercoupe, which the Federal Aviation Administration has designated a light sport aircraft. Designed in the 1940s, the Ercoupe was built without rudder pedals. Instead, the rudder is interconnected with the ailerons through the yoke. This unique design allows Cox to control the airplane with one foot controlling the yoke while the other foot controls the throttle.

In 2019, Cox received a 1946 Ercoupe 415-C (Serial number #3153) with tail number N26R. She has stated she will use the airplane to promote the mission of Rightfooted Foundation International that "disability does not mean inability." In July 2020, Cox used the airplane to celebrate the 30th anniversary of the Americans with Disabilities Act by taking retired Senator Tom Harkin on a flight near Washington, DC. Senator Harkin had introduced the Americans with Disabilities Act to the US Senate in 1990.

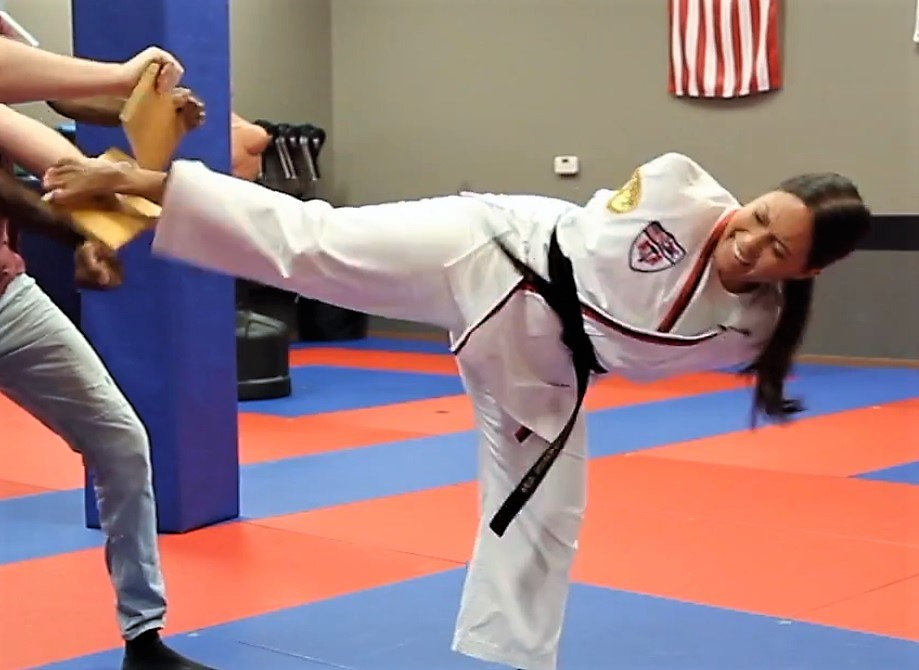
Cox breaking a board in 2017

At the age of 10, Cox began training in taekwondo at a school in her hometown of Sierra Vista. At the age of 14, she earned her first black belt. While in college at the University of Arizona Cox restarted her Taekwondo training at an American Taekwondo Association club on campus. In an effort to help future students without the use of arms, the instructors created an entire training curriculum by modifying the standard material from the ATA. For example, instead of a punch Cox executes a knee strike. Cox has since gone on to earn her second and third degree black belts in the ATA. Cox has also earned the title of 2014 Arizona State Champion in forms. She did not compete in a special abilities ring.

In 2019, Cox became a fourth degree black belt.

Cox works as a motivational speaker and has shared her message in 26 different countries.

In 2014, Cox competed in the 40 mile segment of El Tour de Tucson.

In 2015, Cox published an autobiographical self-help book, Disarm Your Limits, in order to inspire people to overcome their own challenges through the lessons she has learned in her life.

== Media influence ==
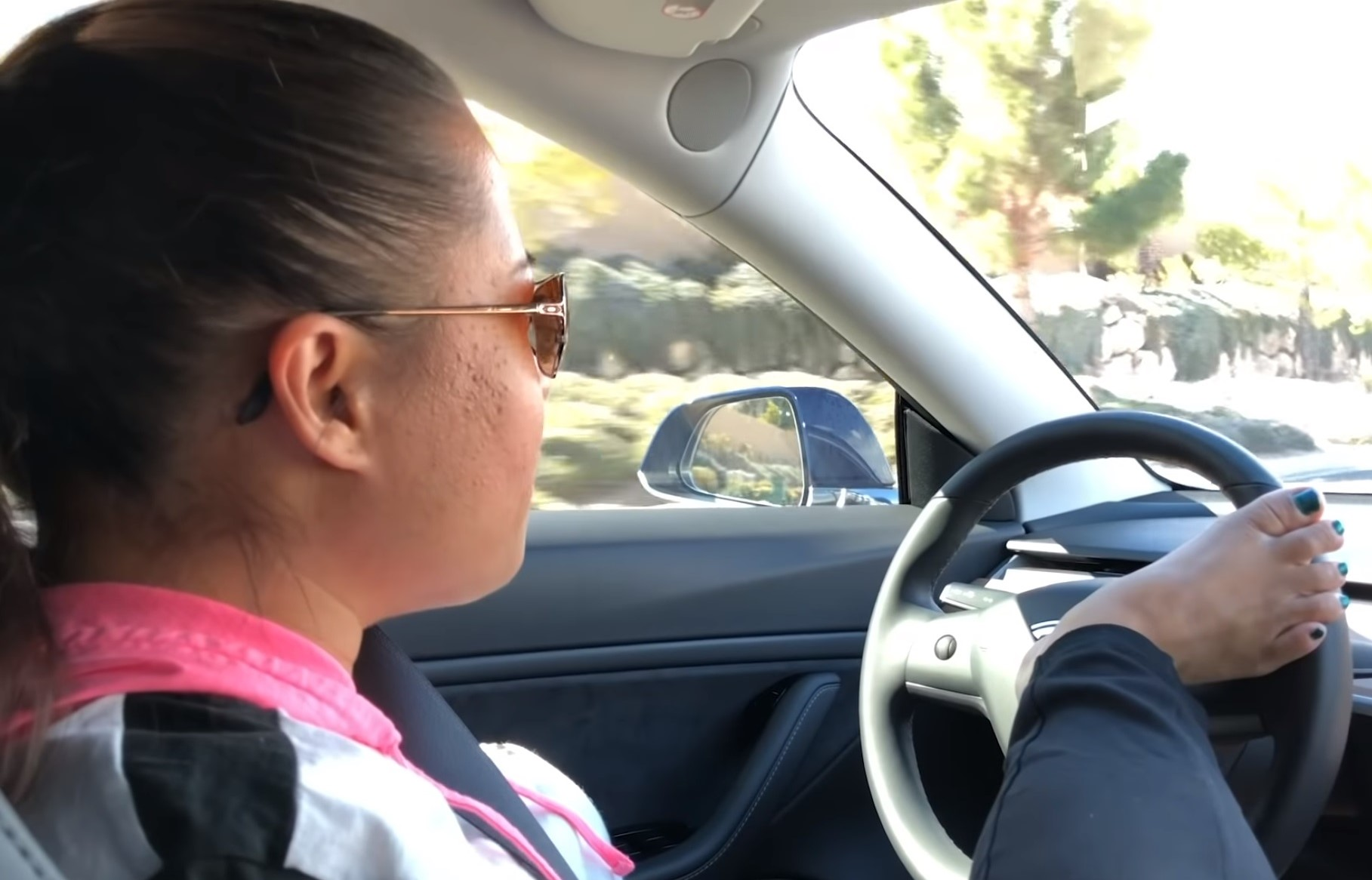
Cox driving a Tesla, Inc. electric car in 2019

Cox is the subject of the documentary Right Footed. The film is directed by Emmy Award winning filmmaker Nick Spark. The documentary chronicles Cox' life, mentorship, and humanitarian trips to Ethiopia and the Philippines, as well as her efforts to pass the CRPD in the US Senate.

The patented invention of a "Lower Extremity Vehicle Navigation Control System," which allows people to drive a car without the use of their upper body, by the Emirati engineer Reem Al Marzouqi was inspired by Cox.

== See also ==
- Patrick Henry Hughes, musician born blind and unable to fully utilize his limbs.
- Hirotada Ototake, sports writer and survivor of Tetra-amelia syndrome.
- Nick Vujicic, motivational speaker and survivor of Tetra-amelia syndrome.
