= Ectromelia =

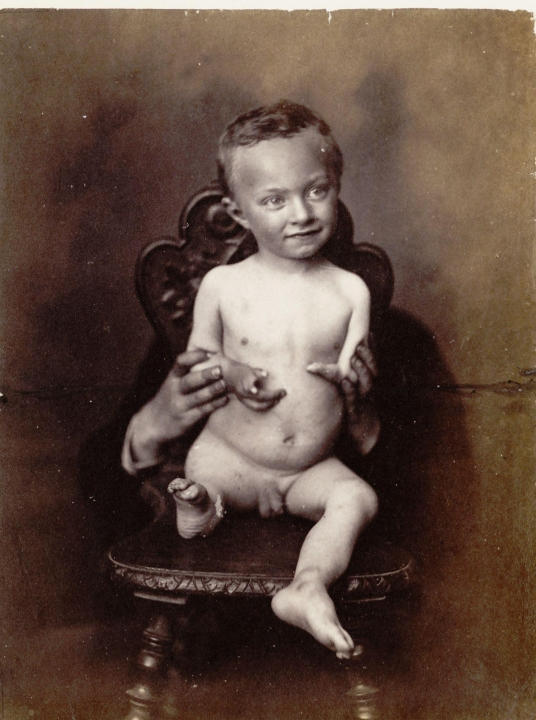
- Ectromelia and phocomelia, 1871
- Specialty: Orthopedic

Ectromelia is a congenital condition where long bones are missing or underdeveloped. Examples include:

- Amelia
- Hemimelia
- Phocomelia
- Sirenomelia
