= Violetta (performer) =

Limbless sideshow performer (1907–1970)

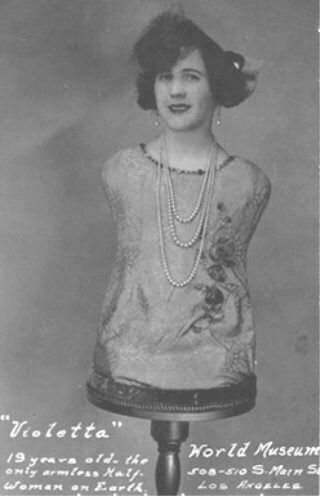
- Violetta in 1925
- Born: Aloisia Wagner; March 24, 1907; Hemelingen, German Empire
- Died: August 11, 1973 (aged 66); Hemelingen, Bremen, West Germany
- Known for: having tetra-amelia syndrome, sideshow performer
- Height: 3 ft (91 cm)

Aloisia Wagner (March 24, 1907 – August 11, 1973), better known by her stage name Violetta, was a German-American woman who was born without legs or arms with a condition known as tetra-amelia syndrome. She was born in Hemelingen, German Empire, and had a lengthy career in sideshow performance.

Aloisia Wagner was born on March 24, 1907.

On March 23, 1924, the day before her 17th birthday, she left her birth city of Bremen-Hemelingen, Weimar Republic, with her stepbrother and manager, Karl Grobecker, aboard the SS George Washington, which arrived in New York on April 3, 1924. According to the ship manifest, Aloisia had blonde hair and green eyes, was three feet tall, and was allowed into the U.S. for 25 weeks to work for Samuel W. Gumpertz in his Dreamland Circus Side Show. She was the daughter of Elise Wagner, of Hemelingen. The manifest's "Held For Special Inquiry" page shows that both were held (in the hospital) for one day before being allowed to enter the U.S. Other pages of the manifest from this ship list many members of the John Robinson Circus, which was later acquired by John Ringling, Violetta's later employer.

For many years, Aloisia performed in several sideshows and freak shows as a singer and oddity, including Coney Island's Dreamland, the Ringling Bros. and Barnum & Bailey Circus, and the Mighty Haag Circus. A 1925 photo shows her performing at the World Museum (freak show) in Los Angeles. According to his biography, Jean Cocteau visited Violetta at Luna Park, Paris in 1927, describing her as "a stubborn German woman." In 1929, the Belgian surrealist journal Variétés published a photo of Violetta.

Wallace Stort of the London Life Magazine wrote about her several times. Stort's 1940 article is the last known publication referencing Violetta, describing in detail how she moved herself by hopping from place to place on the bottom of her torso and was able to manipulate objects with her mouth enough to comb her own hair, dress herself, thread a needle, and sew. Stort also stated that Violetta was married and wore her wedding band on a gold chain around her neck, though no other information about her husband is known.

Eventually, she returned to her hometown of Hemelingen, West Germany, dying on August 11, 1973, at the age of 66.

== See also ==
- Prince Randian, American limbless sideshow performer, who appeared in film Freaks in 1932
- Nick Vujicic, a Christian evangelist and motivational speaker
- Hirotada Ototake, a sports writer
