= The Butterfly Circus =

- Directed by: Joshua Weigel
- Written by: Joshua Weigel; Rebekah Weigel
- Produced by: Joshua & Rebekah Weigel
- Starring: Eduardo Verastegui; Nick Vujicic; Doug Jones
- Cinematography: Brian Baugh
- Edited by: Chris Witt
- Music by: Tim Williams
- Production company: Peacetree Productions
- Distributed by: The Doorpost Film Project
- Release date: August 31, 2009
- Running time: 20 minutes
- Country: United States
- Language: English

The Butterfly Circus is a short independent film, created by Joshua and Rebekah Weigel in 2009.

== Plot ==
Set in the depression-era 1930s America, "The Butterfly Circus" is set in a dismal time period, characterized by the unemployed and homeless masses, everyone concerned for the difficult economic situation. Mr. Mendez is the charismatic master of a small circus, the Butterfly Circus, and he leads his troupe through Southern California. Along the way, they perform – sometimes for free – to bring some light into the dull lives of people. One evening, they see a sign for a carnival with a sideshow. Upon arriving they see a fun fair with carousels, games, and other entertainment, including a freak show. Here Mr. Mendez meets Will, the main attraction of the freak show, who has tetra-amelia syndrome, meaning that Will is limbless: he is on display alongside other odd characters, such as a painted (tattooed) man and a bearded woman. Will is bitter and unhappy, but after meeting Mendez, he decides to leave the carnival, hiding on one of the Butterfly Circus trucks to escape. The people in the circus welcome Will, but Mr. Mendez tells him he must do something else than just be a freak to become part of the act. Will gets to know his new friends and learns that many of them have a sad past, but that Mr. Mendez has given them a second chance in life. One day Will accidentally realizes that he can swim, so he decides to perform a difficult act in the circus. He is raised to the top of a tall pole and dives into a small tank full of water. Will is now happy since he is in the show not because of his odd appearance but because of who he is and what he can do.

== Production ==
The production was completed in 12 days by a cast and crew of over 150 people, on locations in the Southern California regions of the San Gabriel Mountains, Riverside, Palmdale and Santa Clarita. Director Joshua Weigel has stated that he will be working on writing a feature-length version of the script.

== Cast and crew ==
The movie features internationally recognized motivational speaker Nick Vujicic, Latino celebrity Eduardo Verástegui (from Bella), Doug Jones who played the Pale Man in Pan's Labyrinth, the Silver Surfer in Fantastic Four-Rise of the Silver Surfer and Abe Sapien in Hellboy II: The Golden Army.

- Director: Joshua Weigel
- Writer: Joshua Weigel & Rebekah Weigel
- Producers: Joshua Weigel, Rebekah Weigel, Angie Alvarez
- Executive Producers: Jon & Esther Phelps, Jason Atkins, Nathan Christopher Haase, Bob Yerkes, Ed Vizenor
- Director of Photography: Brian Baugh
- Production Designer: Yeva McCloskey
- Editor: Chris Witt
- Cast: Nick Vujicic, Alex Lehmbeck, Doug Jones, Matt Allmen, Mark Atteberry, Kirk Bovill, Lexi Pearl, Connor Rosen
- Original Score: Timothy Williams

== Reception ==
By July 2010, the film had already accumulated over 7 million collective online views primarily through posts on YouTube. Ten years later the film had over 70M views and has been translated and dubbed into 33 languages by fans (www.thebutterflycircus.com).

== Awards ==
The film was the Grand Prize winner of The Doorpost Film Project. In 2010, the film also won two awards as the Best Short Film at the 2010 Method Fest Independent Film Festival. Butterfly Circus also won the best short film award at The Feel Good Film Festival in Hollywood in 2010.

Nick Vujicic, an international motivational and evangelistic speaker from Australia who has tetra-amelia syndrome, debuted in film and received the Best Actor in Short Film award at the 2010 Method Fest Independent Film Festival, for his starring performance as Will. Along with his many life experiences, Nick recounts working on the film in his book titled Life Without Limits: Inspiration for a Ridiculously Good Life (Random House, 2010).
