= Pillow Man =

Pillow Man may refer to:

- The Pillowman, a 2003 play by Irish playwright Martin McDonagh
- Prince Randian (1871–1934), sideshow performer nicknamed "Pillow Man"
- "Pillow Man", a track on the album Raw by Hopsin

== See also ==
- My Pillow Guy (Mike Lindell; born 1961), American businessman
