= Sealo =

American circus performer

- Born: Stanislaus Berent; November 24, 1901; Pittsburgh, Pennsylvania, U.S.
- Died: 1980 (aged 78–79); Pittsburgh, Pennsylvania, U.S.
- Other names: Sealo the Seal Boy; Seal Boy; Stanley Berent
- Occupations: Freak show performer Cards seller Newspaper seller
- Known for: "Seal arms"

Stanislaus Berent (November 24, 1901 – 1980) was an American performer who performed at many freak shows, including the World Circus Sideshow in 1941 under the stage name of Sealo the Seal Boy (often stylized to just Sealo). He was known for his seal-like arms, which were caused by a congenital medical condition known as phocomelia. In 2001, Mat Fraser's play inspired by Sealo called Sealboy: Freak debuted.

== Early life ==
Berent was born November 24, 1901, in Pittsburgh, Pennsylvania. He was brought up as a Polish Catholic. He had an extremely rare congenital disorder known as phocomelia, which caused his "seal arms". He had no arms; his hands grew from his shoulders.

== Career ==
Sealo started off his career as a newspaper seller, then was discovered by freak scouters. He was a regular feature at Coney Island's freak show from circa 1920 to 1970 and was exaggerated as a human with a seal body on some promotional sideshow posters. Sealo was still able to carry out feats like sawing a crate in half and shaving with a straight razor on his own, as well as moulding animal figurines out of clay. His partner on-stage was Toby, a chimpanzee. Sealo had trouble getting up and down the performance stage due to his weak legs. He would spend the time in which he was not performing on stage selling pitch cards. After performing, he preferred resting at hotels to sleeping at the fairground. He performed at the World Circus Sideshow in 1941. He also toured around the world and performed at many other freak shows.

Sealo's freak show career lasted for thirty-five years; he retired in 1976 and moved to Showmen's Retirement Village in Gibsonton, Florida. He returned to his hometown of Pittsburgh afterwards when his health started to decline. He spent his final days at a Catholic hospital and died in 1980.

== Personal life ==
Sealo was of Polish ancestry. His sister was a nun. He spent his free time playing cards and was an avid drinker.

== In popular culture ==
- The play Sealboy: Freak premiered in 2001 and was showcased at the Bodies of Work disability arts festival in 2005, which was held in Chicago. It "tells the story of both Berent [Sealo] and a contemporary actor loosely based on [Mat] Fraser."
- He is mentioned in Tom Waits' song Lucky Day (Overture) from his album The Black Rider, about sideshow performers.
