= Right Footed =

- Directed by: Nick T. Spark
- Produced by: Nick T. Spark; Lisa Yuchengco
- Starring: Jessica Cox; Patrick Chamberlain
- Cinematography: Bill Megalos
- Edited by: Susan Metzger
- Music by: Nathan Halpern
- Distributed by: Nick Spark Productions LLC
- Release date: November 5, 2015 (Kansas International Film Festival)
- Running time: 82 minutes
- Country: United States
- Language: English

Right Footed is a documentary about Jessica Cox directed by Nick T. Spark and produced by Nick T. Spark and Mona Lisa Yuchengco. Cox was born without arms but has learned to live a fulfilling life including getting married, earning two black belts and becoming the first person without arms to fly an airplane.

The film follows Cox as she begins new roles as a mentor and disability rights advocate. She visits both Ethiopia and the Philippines on behalf of Handicap International to help people with disabilities, and advocates for the adoption of the Convention on the Rights of Persons with Disabilities in the US Senate. The film also follows her personal life as Cox is shown supporting her mother Inez as she battles cancer, beginning her married life with her husband Patrick Chamberlain, and mentoring children with disabilities in the United States and abroad.

== Funding and support ==
Right Footed was fiscally sponsored by the International Documentary Association and also affiliated with the Creative Visions Foundation, Handicap International USA and Filipino broadcaster ABS-CBN. Financial support for the film came primarily from individual donations. Two Indiegogo campaigns collected over $60,000.

== Film festivals ==
Right Footed premiered at the 2015 Mirabile Dictu Film Festival, known as the "Catholic Academy Awards", at the Vatican City, Rome, where it won the "Best Documentary" honor. The 2015 EAA AirVenture airshow was the venue for the US premiere. The film has also been part of the official selection at over 50 other film festivals in the United States and Canada, Europe, Asia, and South America including:

- Portland Film Festival
- DOCUTAH
- Cleveland International Film Festival
- Manchester International Film Festival
- Cincinnati Film Festival
- Offshoot Film Festival
- Newburyport Documentary Film Festival
- Catalina Film Festival
- New Jersey Film Festival
- Cinema Touching Disability Film Festival
- Kansas International Film Festival
- Napa Valley Film Festival
- Awareness Film Festival
- Hollywood Film Festival
- Heartland Film Festival
- The Pacific Rim International Conference on Disability and Diversity
- The Taiwan Disability Film Festival

== Awards and honors ==
Right Footed won 17 awards in film festival competition including "Best Social Action Film 2015" at the Hollywood Film Festival. It also won the "Best Documentary" honor at the Mirabile Dictu film festival, the International Film Festival Manhattan, the Beloit International Film Festival, the Philadelphia Asian American Film Festival, and the Offshoot Film Festival. It received the "Audience Award" at the Awareness Film Festival, the Atlanta DocuFest, the Newburyport Documentary Film Festival, the Kansas International Film Festival, and the Beloit "Year Round" Film Festival. It also received the Spotlight Documentary Film Platinum Award. The film also received a Certificate of Merit at the Catalina Film Festival. It was nominated for competition at the Napa Valley Film Festival.

The film was also selected for the American Film Program's Documentary Film Showcase operated by the U.S. Department of State and the University of Southern California.

== iTunes and DVD release ==
On October 5, 2016, it was announced that "Right Footed" would be released on DVD for private home use and through Brainstorm Media on iTunes in the United States on November 1, 2016, and that an educational version would be made available through Kanopy. The DVD features an additional 25 minutes of video material including deleted scenes, a commentary track with Jessica Cox, and is closed captioned in English, Portuguese and Spanish.

== Release on National Geographic ==
On February 2, 2017, it was announced that a 55-minute version of "Right Footed" would be released on the National Geographic Channel networks on six continents, in 83 individual countries around the world.

== Release on Fuse TV ==
On March 8, 2017, it was announced that the 82-minute, film festival version of "Right Footed" would be released on the Fuse (TV channel) in the United States as part of the network's "They Have a Dream" series of documentary films. Fuse later announced that the premiere screening would take place on May 20, 2017.

== American Film Showcase ==
"Right Footed" screened in Europe, Africa and Asia as part of the American Film Showcase (also known as the American Film Program), a cultural exchange program operated by the U.S. Department of State's Bureau of Educational and Cultural Affairs and the University of Southern California.

== Critical reaction and reviews ==
The film earned an "all ages" review by the Dove Foundation and was awarded five Doves, the highest possible rating. It also earned high marks from Common Sense Media receiving a rating of "highly recommended" and the Common Sense Seal indicating that it is "great for families". Booklist gave the film a starred review and noted that "teens will be awed by Cox’s courage and accomplishments." The Independent Critic gave the film an A− and noted that "Right Footed is the kind of film that will appeal to your heart and your mind and your faith in humanity. It's the kind of film you'll watch, you'll watch again and then you'll simply have to share it.".
