= Howerton =

Howerton is an English toponymic surname, which indicates someone from Horton in Northampton. Notable people with the surname include:

- Bill Howerton (1921–2001), American baseball player
- Cait Howerton (born 1990), American LGBTQ+ Certified Financial Planner Professional™️
- Charles Howerton, American television and film actor
- Clarence Chesterfield Howerton (1913–1975), American circus performer
- Cyndi Howerton, American politician
- Glenn Howerton (born 1976), American television and film actor
- Hayden Howerton (born 1999), American football player
- Kent Howerton (born 1954), American motocross racer
