= Autosomal dominant multiple pterygium syndrome =

- Other names: Distal arthrogryposis type 8
- Autosomal dominant multiple pterygium syndrome is inherited in an autosomal dominant fashion.
- Specialty: Dermatology

Autosomal dominant multiple pterygium syndrome is a cutaneous condition inherited in an autosomal dominant fashion.

== Presentation ==
The key features of autosomal dominant multiple pterygium syndrome are proximal and distal joint contractures; pterygia (of the neck, axilla, elbows, or knees); variable fusion of the vertebrae, carpal, and tarsal bones; and short stature.

== Society ==
Musician Patrick Henry Hughes has a type of this condition.

== See also ==
- Arthrogryposis
- Escobar syndrome
- Popliteal pterygium syndrome
- List of cutaneous conditions
