= R-spondin 2 =

Protein and coding gene in humans

RSPO2

Identifiers
- Aliases: RSPO2, CRISTIN2, R-spondin 2, TETAMS2, HHRRD
- External IDs: OMIM: 610575; MGI: 1922667; GeneCards: RSPO2

Gene location (Human)
Chr.	Chromosome 8 (human)
Band	8q23.1	Start	107,899,316 bp
Band	8q23.1	End	108,083,642 bp

Gene location (Mouse)
Chr.	Chromosome 15 (mouse)
Band	15 B3.1|15 16.73 cM	Start	42,884,190 bp
Band	15 B3.1|15 16.73 cM	End	43,034,222 bp
RNA expression pattern
Bgee	Human / Mouse (ortholog); Top expressed in: secondary oocyte; gastric mucosa; prefrontal cortex; Achilles tendon; Brodmann area 9; right lung; testicle; right frontal lobe; muscle layer of sigmoid colon; cingulate gyrus / Top expressed in: primary oocyte; secondary oocyte; zygote; stroma of bone marrow; lumbar spinal ganglion; facial motor nucleus; iris; vestibular sensory epithelium; calvaria; Jacobson's organ; More reference expression data
BioGPS	n/a
Gene ontology
Molecular function	heparin binding; signaling receptor binding; protein binding; frizzled binding
Cellular component	extracellular region; cell surface; extracellular space
Biological process	positive regulation of canonical Wnt signaling pathway; positive regulation of Wnt signaling pathway; bone mineralization; lung growth; dopaminergic neuron differentiation; epithelial tube branching involved in lung morphogenesis; Wnt signaling pathway; embryonic forelimb morphogenesis; negative regulation of odontogenesis of dentin-containing tooth; osteoblast differentiation; response to stimulus; trachea cartilage morphogenesis; embryonic hindlimb morphogenesis; multicellular organism development; limb development
Sources:Amigo / QuickGO
Orthologs
Databases	NCBI: entry; OMA: entry
Species	Human	Mouse
Entrez	340419	239405
Ensembl	ENSG00000147655	ENSMUSG00000051920
UniProt	Q6UXX9	Q8BFU0
RefSeq (mRNA)	NM_001282863; NM_178565; NM_001317942	NM_172815; NM_001357956; NM_001357957
RefSeq (protein)	NP_001269792; NP_001304871; NP_848660	NP_766403; NP_001344885; NP_001344886
Location (UCSC)	Chr 8: 107.9 – 108.08 Mb	Chr 15: 42.88 – 43.03 Mb
PubMed search
- Wikidata
View/Edit Human	View/Edit Mouse

R-spondin 2 also known as roof plate-specific spondin-2 is a secreted protein that in humans that is encoded by the RSPO2 gene.

R-spondin 2 synergizes with canonical WNT to activate beta-catenin. RSPO2 has been proposed to regulate craniofacial patterning and morphogenesis within pharyngeal arch 1 through ectoderm-mesenchyme signaling via the endothelin-Dlx5/6 pathway.

In dogs, a variant on the Rspo2 gene is associated moustache and eyebrow thickness.

In humans, recessive mutations in RSPO2 abrogate limb and lung development. Bruno Reversade and colleagues have reported in 2018 that loss of RSPO2 results in a syndrome of Tetra-amelia with lung agenesis.
