= Clarence Chesterfield Howerton =

American circus performer (1913–1975)

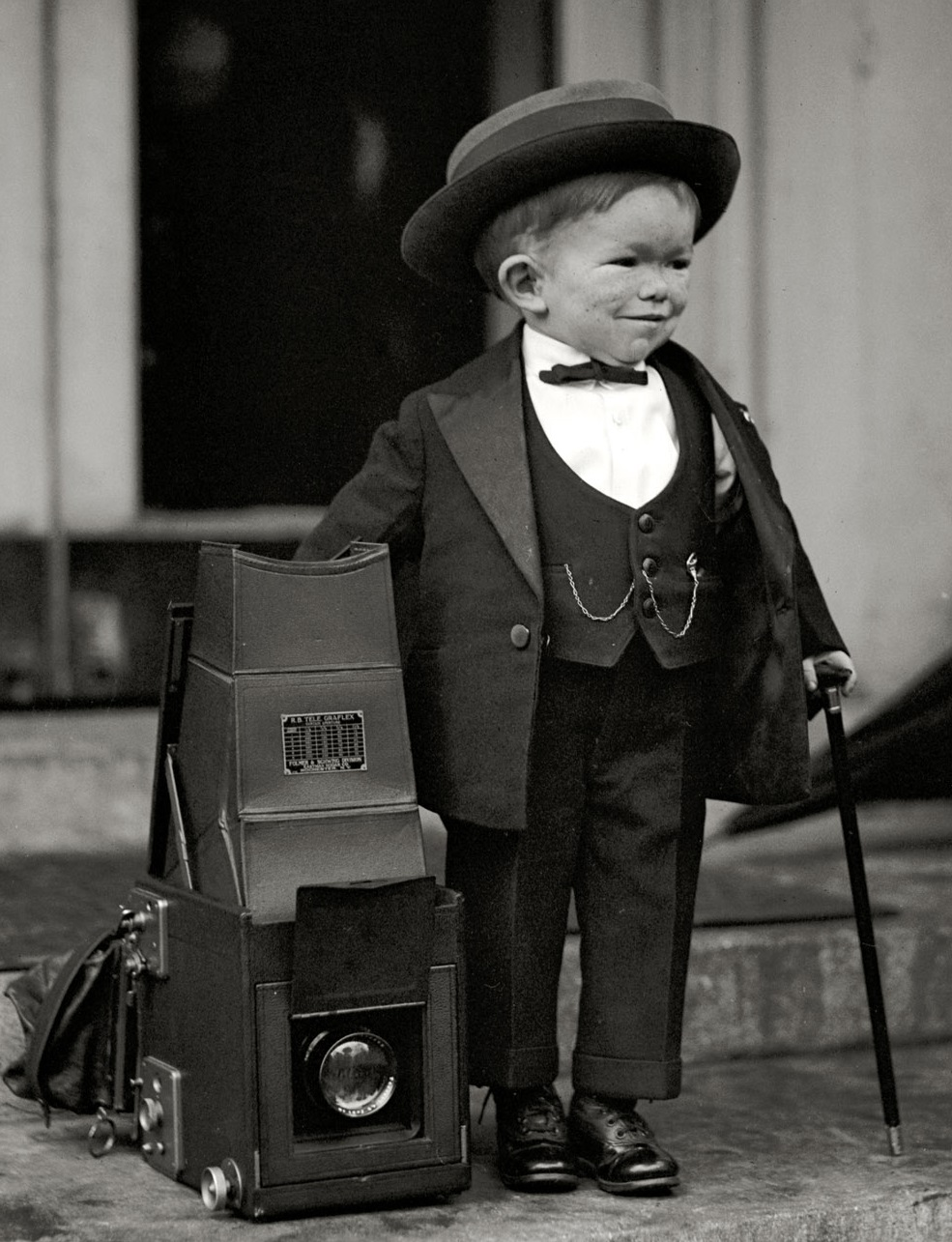
- "Major Mite" at the White House, 1922
- Born: February 9, 1913; Salem, Oregon, US
- Died: November 18, 1975 (aged 62); McMinnville, Oregon, US
- Resting place: 49.23496°N 123.092798°W
- Occupations: Circus performer; actor
- Height: 2 ft 4 in (0.71 m); 3 ft 6 in (1.07 m)

Clarence Chesterfield Howerton (February 9, 1913 – November 18, 1975), also known as Major Mite, was an American circus performer who starred in the sideshow for over 25 years, 20 of which were with the Ringling Bros. and Barnum & Bailey Circus. He was 2 ft 4 in (0.71 m) tall and performed with several groups from the early 1920s through the late 1940s, billed as the smallest man in the world. His small physique was often contrasted alongside larger circus sideshow acts, such as the juvenile obese and the excessively tall.

Regarded as a "highly successful sideshow [novelty]" and celebrity, Howerton visited the White House and represented recruitment efforts of the United States Marine Corps. He was featured in multiple films, including a role as a Munchkin in 1939's The Wizard of Oz. He retired in 1949.

== Early life ==
Clarence Chesterfield Howerton was born on February 9, 1913, in Salem, Oregon, to Frank and Helen Howerton. He had five brothers, all of whom grew to 6 ft (1.83 m) tall. However, Howerton grew to a height of only 2 ft 4 in (0.71 m). An expert said that he might have a "deranged ductless gland". Howerton's mother was just over 4 ft 0 in (1.22 m) tall, which led some to wonder if his small stature was inherited.

At age six, Howerton was living in McCleary, Washington, with his parents and five brothers, Albert, Ernest, Forrest, LeRoy, and Charles. His father was employed at the time as a factory mechanic. Howerton never attended school, likely owing to his physical size and associated emotional consequences.

In January 1926, Frank Howerton shot himself, having been in poor health previously. His mother subsequently married Robert Crawford. At the time of the 1930 United States census, Howerton was living with Crawford and his mother in Manhattan. According to the census listing, Crawford was a "showman" while Howerton and his mother were identified as performers.

== Career ==
Howerton's career began at a young age, when his father entered him into a local vaudeville show. In 1923, at the age of ten, Howerton joined the Ringling Brothers and Barnum & Bailey Circus, where he starred as a major attraction. The circus was the largest of the kind, with 800 performers and over 1000 animals. Although he was only ten years old, the circus sought to exaggerate his diminutive size by claiming that he was 18 years old. He was billed as the smallest man in the world, exhibited and known to the public under the name, "Major Mite". The "Major Mite" moniker had previously been used by an American comedian who died in 1900, and a 19th-century circus performer, William E. Jackson, who died in 1901, at 24, 2 ft 9 in (0.84 m) tall and weighing 26 pounds (12 kg). Accompanied by his mother, Howerton spent 20 years with Ringling Brothers and also worked with the Cole Brothers Circus, the Coney Island Dreamland Side Show, and the World Circus Sideshow.

In December 1922, Howerton received national press coverage when he visited U.S. President Warren G. Harding at the White House and was billed as "the world's smallest man." One newspaper noted at the time: "The smallest midget and the smallest Shriner in the world, known as Major Mite, caused more excitement when he called at the White House recently than many a notable has done."

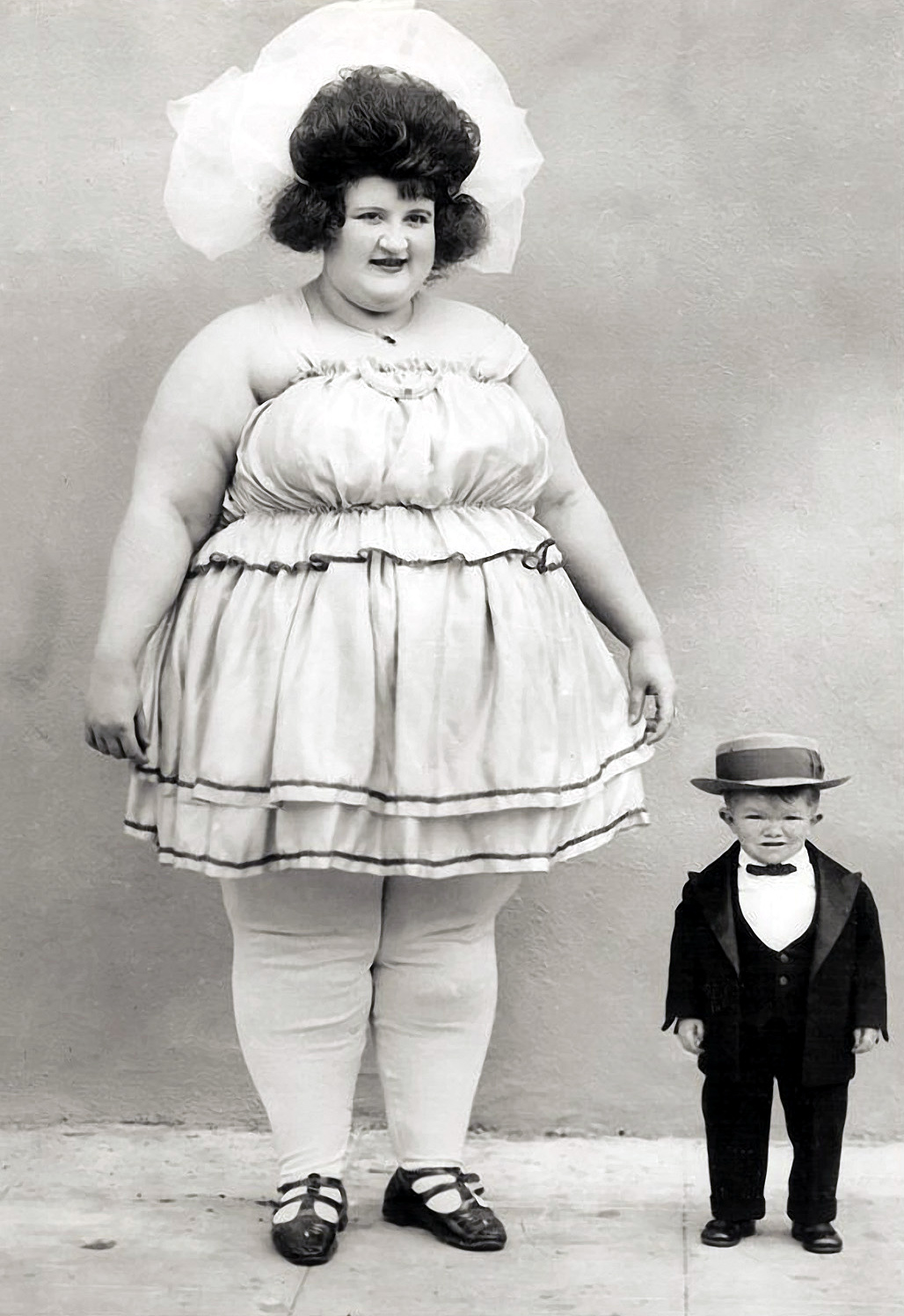
Howerton with the world's largest woman in 1922.

In 1927, Howerton drew the attention of The New York Times when he led a "strange cavalcade" through the streets of Manhattan to the Hospital for Crippled and Ruptured Children. Howerton led the parade in the original coach that had previously been used by General Tom Thumb. The coach was drawn by two Shetland ponies, and Howerton was accompanied by "Tiny Doll", described as "the Major's sweetheart" and other circus performers. He also drew the attention of the Chicago Tribune when he visited Chicago in 1928.

In 1928, Howerton was paired with an extraordinarily large circus sideshow performer known as "Tom Ton" and billed as the "Human Atom" and "Big Baby Elephant." Howerton is said to have performed with numerous human oddities, also working with Ruth Pontico, a woman weighing 700 pounds (320 kg), in his career.

In advertising and film, Howerton found success beyond the sideshow. During the 1930s, he was used as a mascot for the recruitment side of the United States Marine Corps. His biggest role in acting was with 1939's The Wizard of Oz, in which he played the part of a trumpet-playing Munchkin, Herald #3, who announced the arrival of the mayor. He was one of the smallest Munchkins in Oz. Howerton also appeared in the 1932 Our Gang comedy "Free Eats".

By 1940, he was living with his mother in Manhattan. His occupation was described as "exhibitionist" in a circus, but a 1941 document states that he registered with "Clackamas County Local Board No. 2", located in Estacada, Oregon; his registration prompted the Board to state: "We believe we have the smallest registrant in the United States". In the announcement of his registration, his weight and height are given, vastly contrasting to other sources: a height of 3 ft 6 in (1.07 m) and a weight of 52 pounds (24 kg). His last performance was for Cole Bros. in 1948.

== Reputation ==
Howerton was often seen with other human oddities; for example, in 1924, he was photographed with Martin Feig, a four-year-old boy who weighed 104 pounds. Feig reportedly said to Howerton, "Aw, you're nothing but a germ-weight midget." One newspaper referred to Howerton, who was in reality only 13 years old at the time, as "the Beau Brummel of the side shows", noting that the Doll sisters (two female small persons working with Ringling Brothers) declared him "a regular sheik".

In contrast to his public persona, Howerton reportedly enjoyed cigars and beer, "often yelled obscenities", and was known to "run the length of a bar, kicking anything in his way", sometimes whilst dressed in children's clothes. While working with Ringling Brothers, Howerton befriended Jack Earle, who was 7 ft 7 1/2 in (2.32 m) tall, but at the time was advertised as being 8 ft 7 in (2.62 m). The two were often photographed together in promotional materials for Ringling Brothers, with it being said that "it is penny-ante poker which has made pals of Jack and the major".

=== Size ===
Reports of Howerton's size range vastly; the upper boundary for both height and weight is given by the United States Selective Service System, who report a height of 3 ft 6 in (1.07 m) and a weight of 52 pounds (24 kg). A height of 2 ft 4 in (0.71 m) is given in several more modern sources, including Ripley's Believe It or Not!: Howerton himself claimed that was his height at 22, and that his weight was 20 pounds (9.1 kg) The Chicago Tribune gave his height as 2 ft 2 in (0.66 m) and his weight as 20 pounds (9.1 kg). At 18, it was reported that he weighed 13 pounds (5.9 kg).

== Post entertainment industry and death ==
Howerton retired from the entertainment industry in 1949 at the age of 35. By 1970 he had moved back to Oregon and was living with a niece in the small town of Dayton. His diminutive size meant that he did not pay welfare to the state, as it was "never collected from 'children' less than thirty inches tall". His size, however, meant that he was forced to have tailor-made clothing, which he "demand[ed be] good standard".

On November 18, 1975, at the age of 62, Howerton died of pneumonia in a hospital in McMinnville, Oregon. He was buried in Mountainview Cemetery in nearby Oregon City. Aside from one brother, he outlived all of his immediate family.
