= Amelia (birth defect) =

Failure of limb(s) to develop during embryonic growth

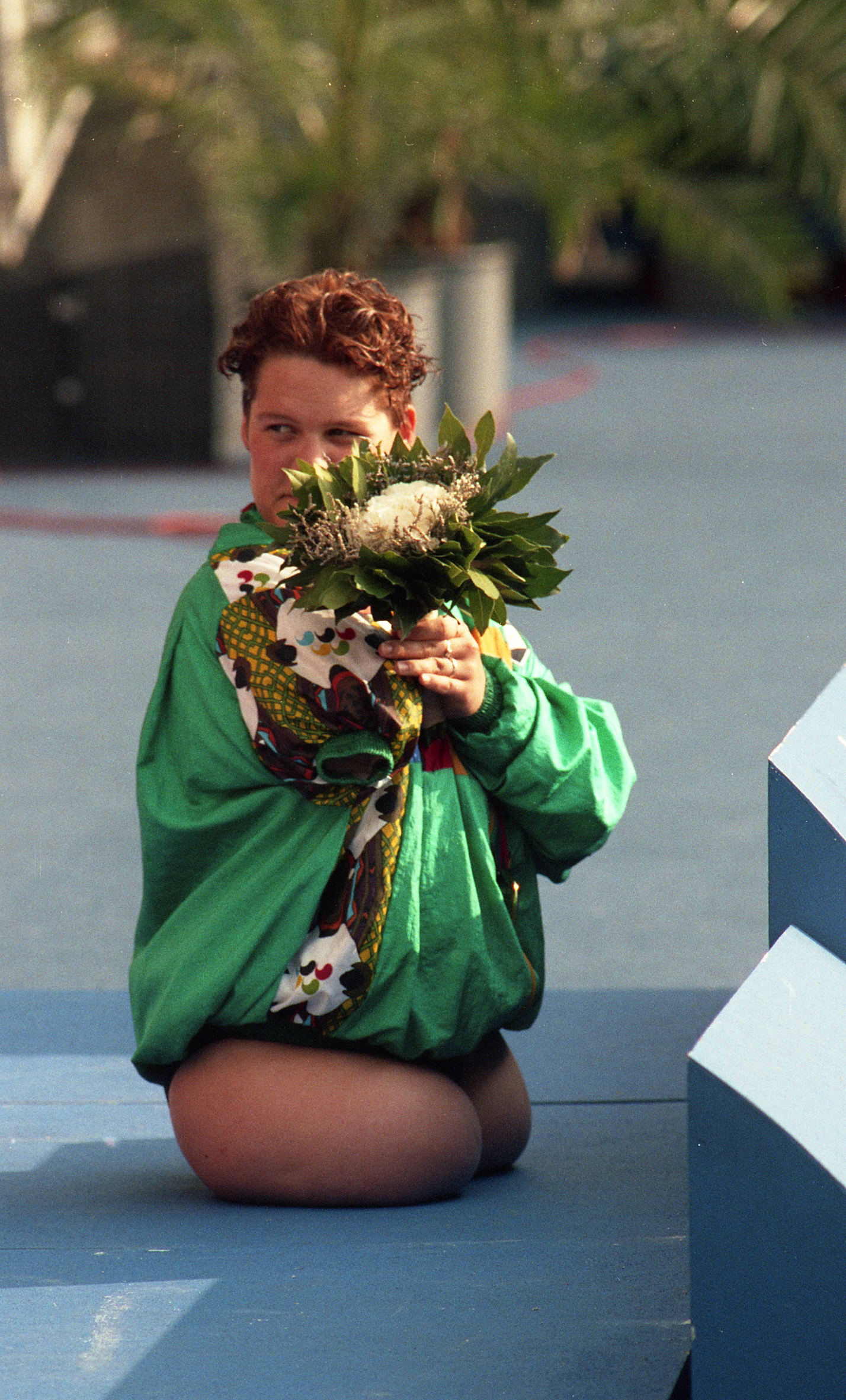
- Amelia affecting both legs and one arm (Tracy Barrell during Paralympics)
- Specialty: Medical genetics

Amelia is the birth defect of lacking one or more limbs. The term may be modified to indicate the number of legs or arms missing at birth, such as tetra-amelia for the absence of all four limbs. The term is from Ancient Greek ἀ- 'lack of' and μέλος 'limb'.

== Symptoms ==
The diagnosis of amelia syndrome is established clinically and can be made on routine prenatal ultrasonography. WNT3 is the only gene known to be associated with tetra-amelia syndrome. Molecular genetic testing on a clinical basis can be used to diagnose the incidence of the syndrome. The mutation detection frequency is unknown as only a limited number of families have been studied. Affected infants are often stillborn or die shortly after birth.

=== Description ===
Tetra-amelia, the complete absence of all four limbs, represents one of the more severe forms of amelia and is an extremely rare congenital anomaly. The cause of amelia is not fully understood; however, it is believed to involve both genetic and environmental factors. The condition can arise due to genetic factors, including mutations in genes such as WNT3 that are critical for early embryonic development, or from environmental influences such as maternal diabetes, intrauterine infections (such as TORCH infections), and exposure to teratogenic substances including alcohol or certain medications. Tetra-amelia is often associated with high morbidity and mortality, particularly when multiple organ systems are involved.

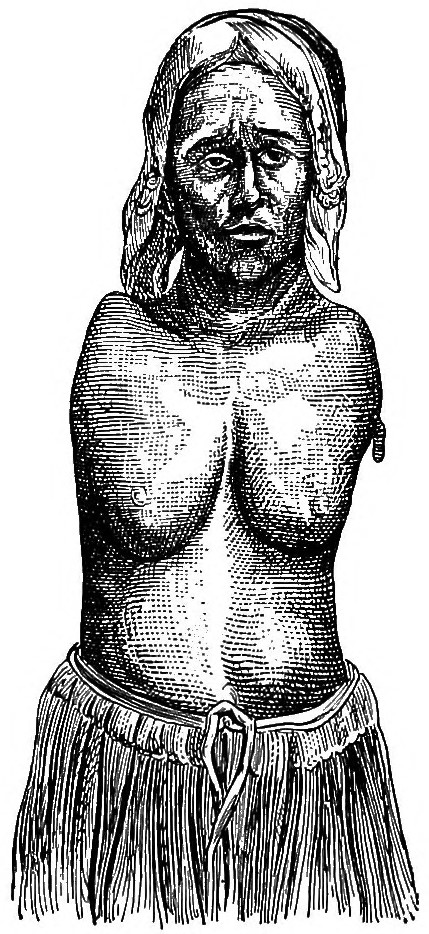
Amelia of the arms in a Hindu woman

Amelia may be present as an isolated defect, but it is often associated with major malformations in other organ systems. These frequently include cleft lip and/or palate, body wall defects, malformed head, and defects of the neural tube, kidneys, and diaphragm. Facial clefts may be accompanied by other facial anomalies such as abnormally small jaw, and missing ears or nose. The body wall defects allow internal organs to protrude through the abdomen. Head malformations may be minor to severe with a near disappearance of the brain. The diaphragm may be herniated or gone and one or both kidneys may be small or absent.

== Causes ==
Between 24 and 36 days after fertilization, development of limb(s) may be impeded. This may eventually lead to complete or partial absence of one or more limbs. Tetra-amelia syndrome appears to have an autosomal recessive pattern of inheritance – that is, the parents of an individual with tetra-amelia syndrome each carry one copy of the mutated gene, but do not show signs and symptoms of the condition.

In some cases, amelia may be attributed to health complications during the early stages of pregnancy, including infection, failed abortion or complications associated with removal of an IUD after pregnancy, or use of teratogenic drugs, such as thalidomide.

== Management ==
A prosthesis can be given to compensate for the missing limb(s).

== See also ==
- Amniotic band constriction
- Dysmelia
- Hemimelia
- Phocomelia
- Thalidomide
