= Hemimelia =

- Other names: Longitudinal meromelia
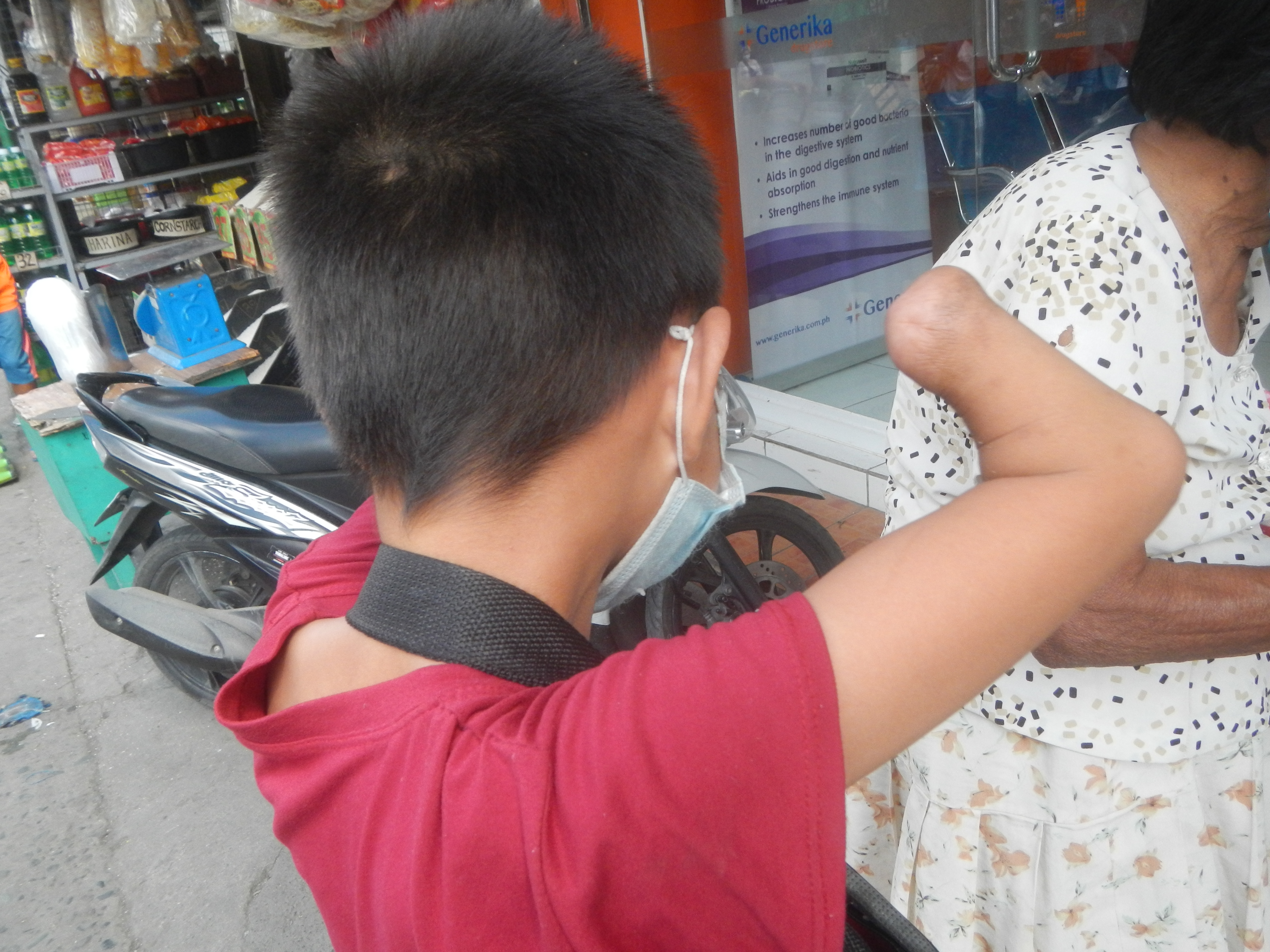
- Terminal defect of an arm with transverse, incomplete hemimelia
- Specialty: Medical genetics

Hemimelia is a birth defect consisting in unilateral or bilateral underdevelopment of the distal part of the lower or upper limb. The affected bone may be shortened or not develop at all.

== Types ==
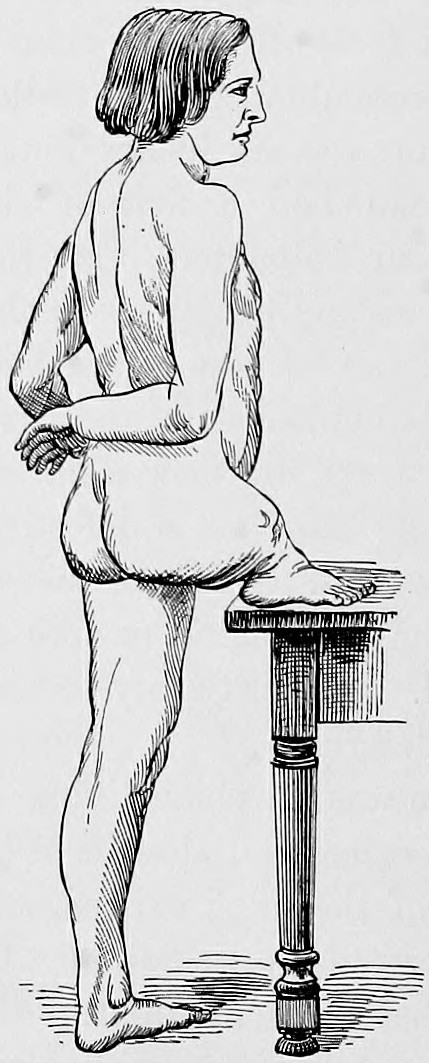
Hemimelia of the right leg (complete absence of leg with foot on hip)

Transverse hemimelia is a congenital absence of part or all of a limb (including hand or foot) and is called amelia when the entire limb is missing. Paraxial hemimelia means partial absence of one of the elements of the limb in the longitudinal axis (in phocomelia there is no complete absence of a part of the limb).

Sub types of hemimelia are the following:

- Fibular hemimelia, congenital longitudinal deficiency of the fibula or fibular longitudinal meromelia
- Tibial hemimelia, congenital longitudinal deficiency of the tibia, congenital aplasia and dysplasia of the tibia with intact fibula, congenital longitudinal deficiency of the tibia or tibial longitudinal meromelia
- Radial hemimelia, congenital longitudinal deficiency of the radius, radial clubhand, radial longitudinal meromelia or radial ray agenesis
- Ulnar hemimelia, congenital longitudinal deficiency of the ulna, ulnar clubhand or ulnar longitudinal meromelia
