= World Circus Sideshow =

Circus sideshow in Coney Island, New York

The World Circus Side Show was a sideshow owned and operated by "Professor" Samuel Wagner from 1922 to 1941 on Surf Avenue, Coney Island, New York.

Known as "The Godfather" of the Coney Island Freak Show, Wagner was a contemporary of other sideshow and circus legends, such as the Ringling Brothers and P.T. Barnum. He endured a legal fight against the famed Robert Moses. Moses, believing the age of sideshow entertainment was over, banned "Balyhoo and Outside Lecturers", which eventually and effectively put the sideshows out of business.

== Notable acts ==
- Pip and Zip, pinheads
- Prince Randian, a human torso
- Lady Olga, bearded lady
- Harry Bulson, The Spider Boy
- Baby Doll, "Pulchritude Queen of the Avoirdupois," beautiful fat lady
- Forrest Layman, an armless wonder
- Flo Lambert, a contortionist
- Myrtle Corbin
- Warren Travis, "World's Strongest Man"
- Bonita Barlowe, "Snake Enchantress"
- Mr. X, "Electric Chair Dynamo"
- Gibbs Sisters, conjoined twins
- Major Mite, World's Smallest Individual"
- Edna Price, neon tube swallower
- Lady Voltese, "Electric Dynamo"
- Stella, "Homeliest Woman in the World"
- Chief Woo Do and his strange people, "Pseudo-primitive Tribe"
- Uncle Charlie Parcansas, "Oldest man on Earth"
- General Tom Thumb and Father, famous dwarves
- Princess Marie, chimpanzee
- Sealo, the seal boy
- Lady Gladys, ventriloquist and expose of the headless girl illusion
- Kukla, "The Bird Girl"
- Ramona, "Europe's Miracle Sex Girl"

A few acts were featured in the 1932 film, Freaks.
