= Prince Randian =

Limbless sideshow performer (1871–1934)

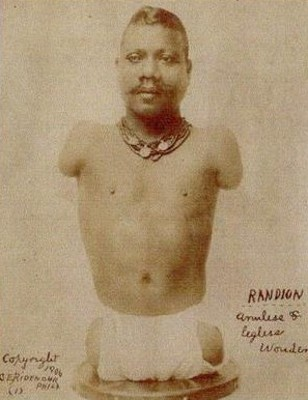
- Prince Randian in 1906
- Born: October 12, 1871; Demerara, British Guiana
- Died: December 19, 1934 (aged 63); New York City, New York, U.S.
- Other names: Rardion; The Living Torso; The Caterpillar Man; The Human Cigar; The Human Caterpillar/Worm
- Occupations: Sideshow performer and film actor
- Years active: 1889–1934
- Known for: Freaks (1932 film)
- Spouse: Princess Sarah
- Children: 5

Prince Randian (sometimes misspelled Rardion or Randion; October 12, 1871 – December 19, 1934), also nicknamed Pillow Man, The Snake Man, The Human Torso, The Human Caterpillar and a variety of other names, was a Guyanese-born American performer with tetra-amelia syndrome and a famous limbless sideshow performer of the early 1900s, best known for his ability to roll cigarettes with his lips.

He was brought to the United States by P.T. Barnum in 1889, at the age of 18, and was a popular Coney Island carnival and circus attraction for 45 years. In 1932, he was featured in the film Freaks, in which he is seen lighting up a cigarette with a match.

== Early life ==
Randian (whose birth name is unknown) was born with no arms or legs in Demerara, British Guiana. He was Hindu and spoke Hindi, English, French, and German. According to a passenger manifest of SS Parima from April 14, 1917, he had lived previously at Charlotte Amalie, Saint Thomas, U.S. Virgin Islands. In the 1920s he was working for Krause Amusement Company and lived in Plainfield, New Jersey.

== Career ==
In 1889, at age 18, Prince Randian was brought from British Guiana to the United States by showman P. T. Barnum to begin a career as a sideshow performer. Over the next 45 years, he appeared with circuses, carnivals, museums, and at Coney Island. He performed under several stage names, including "The Living Torso", "The Human Caterpillar", "The Caterpillar Man", and "The Snake Man".

Randian's act centered on demonstrations of everyday tasks that he had learned to perform using his lips. Wearing a close-fitting, one-piece wool costume that gave him the appearance of a caterpillar, snake, or even a potato, he crossed the stage by rocking his shoulders and hips. He then demonstrated these skills by writing and painting while holding a brush or stylus between his lips and shaving with a razor secured in a wooden block. He kept the tools and materials used in his performance in a wooden box that he reportedly built, painted, and fitted with a lock himself.

Randian was best known for rolling and lighting a cigarette without assistance. He rolled the cigarette from loose tobacco, placed it between his lips, struck a match, and lit it.

By the 1920s, at about age 50, Randian was performing with the Krause Amusement Company while living in Plainfield, New Jersey.

In 1932, at age 60, Randian appeared in Tod Browning's Metro-Goldwyn-Mayer film Freaks, where he performs his cigarette-lighting demonstration.

== Marriage and children ==
At about age 21, Randian married a woman known as Princess Sarah, who was apparently also Hindu and was born c. 1872. They had five children together.

Randian became a father at about age 22 with the birth of his eldest known child, Mary, around 1893. Passenger manifests identify four of their children as Mary Randian (born c. 1893), Richard Randian (born c. 1901), Elizabeth Randian (born c. 1904), and Wilhelmina Randian (born c. 1904). Although contemporary records state that the couple had five children, the identity of the fifth child has not been established from the sources currently cited.

During the 1910s, the family lived in Charlotte Amalie, Saint Thomas, in the U.S. Virgin Islands. A 1917 passenger manifest records their residence there before they later settled in New Jersey. By the 1920s, Randian was performing with the Krause Amusement Company while living in Plainfield, New Jersey. He and Sarah later made their home at 174 Water Street in Paterson, New Jersey, where they lived until his death in 1934, ending a marriage of more than 40 years.

== Death ==
Randian died at 7:00 PM on December 19, 1934, aged 63, of a heart attack shortly after his last performance at Sam Wagner's 14th Street Museum in New York.

== In popular culture ==
An image of Prince Randian from the film Freaks was used on the front cover of the Ramones' 1986 single, "Somebody Put Something in My Drink".

Prince Randian is mentioned in Tom Waits' song "Lucky Day (Overture)" from his album The Black Rider, about sideshow performers.

== See also ==
- Violetta, another limbless sideshow performer
