= Nick T. Spark =

American filmmaker and writer

- Born: United States
- Occupation(s): Film director, writer

Nick T. Spark is an American documentary filmmaker and writer. Films he has written, directed or produced include Regulus: The First Nuclear Missile Submarines (2001) the Emmy award-winning The Legend of Pancho Barnes and the Happy Bottom Riding Club (2009) and Right Footed (2015). In addition to being a contributing editor to Wings and Airpower magazines, his articles have appeared in the Annals of Improbable Research, Naval History, the Journal of the American Aviation Historical Society, and Proceedings. People he has interviewed include President Gerald Ford, British Prime Minister Margaret Thatcher, Secretary of State Colin Powell, disability activist Jessica Cox and numerous test pilots including Charles "Chuck" Yeager. In 2007 Spark was interviewed on National Public Radio, concerning an article he wrote about the USS Panay incident, and he appeared on PBS' History Detectives in 2011 as an expert on the Navy's World War II drone, the TDR-1.

Spark's four-part article Why Everything You Know About Murphy's Law Is Wrong details the history of Murphy's Law. This article was later adapted into a short book A History of Murphy's Law, exploring the genesis of the popular adage which apparently originated at Edwards Air Force Base during the United States Air Force's Project MX981 to research high g-force issues in 1947–1949 under the direction of "The Bravest Man in the Air Force", physicist and medical doctor John Paul Stapp. Spark appeared on Japanese broadcaster NHK concerning the Law in 2000.

== Career ==
Nick Spark attended University High School in Tucson, Arizona where his classmates included Congresswoman Gabby Giffords. He worked as a teen columnist for the Tucson Citizen, and served on the board of a non-profit transportation museum Old Pueblo Trolley, Inc. In 1988, a research paper he published about a World War II mustard gas disaster in Bari, Italy won the Special Naval Award at National History Day. Subsequently, through Spark's efforts, the subject of his paper Stewart F. Alexander was recognized by the Surgeon General of the U.S. Army for his meritorious actions in the aftermath of that incident.

Spark attended the University of Arizona as a Flinn scholar, from which he received a degree in creative writing, with Honors, with a minor in media arts. While at the University of Arizona, he made Just Puttering Around, a 1992 documentary about octogenarian folk artist William Holzman, for which the National Academy of Television Arts and Sciences awarded him a 1992 student Emmy Award. He then attended the University of Southern California's School of Cinema-Television where he received a Masters of Fine Arts degree (MFA) in film production. Subsequently, he received a second student Emmy Award and the Cine Golden Eagle, both for the documentary Upholding the Promise, a film about federal judges directed by Ted Iredell. He is also known for the film, "Right Footed" featuring Jessica Cox.
