= American Film Program =

U.S. program promoting cultural exchange through films

Department of State, Bureau of Educational and Cultural Affairs

The American Film Program is a Cultural Exchange Program provided by the U.S. Department of State's Bureau of Educational and Cultural Affairs.

== Purpose ==
The American Film Program singles out those videos that it views reflect core American principles, such as "individualism, tolerance, ethnic diversity, social responsibility, trust in the law, and the importance of faith and family." One of its core functions is to promote intellectual property rights by helping Americans combat piracy and helping the spread of American film in other markets. Another chief function of the American Film Program is to provide films for the programming of United States Embassies abroad. In addition to providing films for embassy programming, the American Film Program also recruits directors, writers, distributors, anti-piracy experts and other film specialists to share American expertise in the business and creative aspects of filmmaking, such as marketing and distribution, special effects and computer animation.

== American Documentary Showcase ==
The American Documentary Showcase aspect of the American Film Program exhibits independent American films depicting American society culture in foreign countries. It is administered by the University Film and Video Association.

And Then Came John, focused on John McGough, was through the aegis of the 1990 American Showcase of Documentary Films the first American documentary to be shown on national Soviet television.
