= Jack Earle =

American actor (1906–1952)

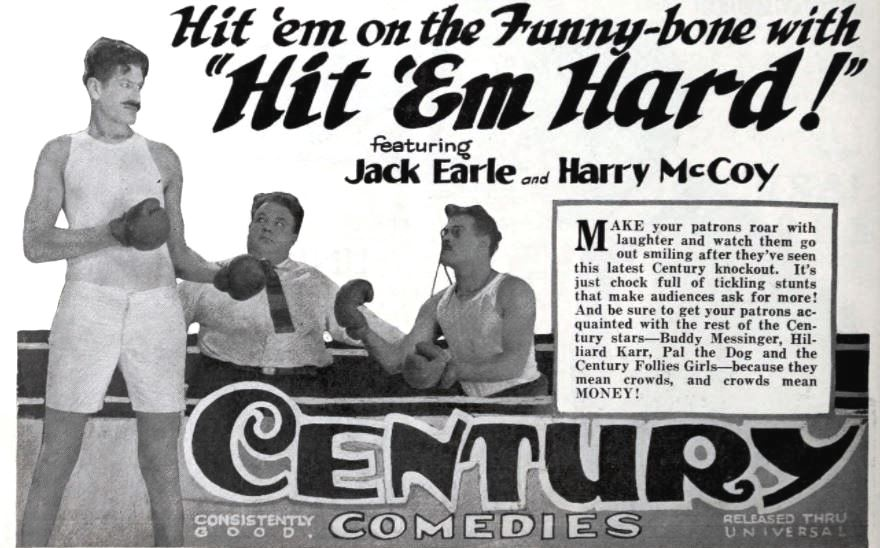
- Advertisement for the film Hit 'em Hard (1924) with Earle at left
- Born: Jacob Rheuben Erlich; July 3, 1906; Denver, Colorado, US
- Died: July 18, 1952 (aged 46); El Paso, Texas, US
- Other names: Texas Giant, The World's Tallest Man
- Occupation(s): Actor freak show performer salesman
- Known for: Barnum and Bailey Circus, Ringling Brothers
- Height: 7 ft 6 in (229 cm)

Jacob Rheuben Erlich (July 3, 1906 – July 18, 1952), professionally credited as Jack Earle, was an American silent film actor and sideshow performer. Earle claimed to be one of the world's tallest humans standing 8 ft 6.5 in (2.60m) however his actual height was only around 7 ft 6 in (229 cm). For 14 years, he traveled with Ringling Bros. and Barnum & Bailey Circus, then became a salesman. He is referenced in Tom Waits's song "Get Behind The Mule".

== Early life ==
He was born in Denver, Colorado, in 1906, the son of Polish Jewish immigrants. He was born at a weight of less than four pounds. For the first few years of his life, Jacob was small for his age, until he reached his seventh birthday. By the time he was ten, he was over six feet tall. His family lived in El Paso, Texas at this time and the locals nicknamed him "Pecos Bill" (a title he used for over twenty years).

Because of his intimidating height, he would avoid people by walking the alleys on his way to school so he could hide if he encountered anyone (for fear of frightening them).

== Career ==
=== Acting ===
When he was thirteen, he and his father made a trip to Los Angeles. Over seven feet tall at the time, he attracted the attention of Century Comedies, a motion picture production company. Jerry Ash and Zion Meyers offered him a job in the movies. He convinced his father that this was a good opportunity, and he was allowed to stay. Jacob took the screen name Jack Earle when he started working in the silent film industry, where he appeared in many movies.

He appeared in films like Hansel and Gretel in 1923 and Jack and the Beanstalk in 1924.

Over the next few years he found himself busy in the movie making business, and going to school.

His movie career came to an end when during filming he fell from collapsed scaffolding. He broke his nose and was hospitalized. While in the hospital, his eyesight became blurry and within days he lost his sight completely. Earle's doctor found a pituitary tumor pressing on his optic nerve. For the next four months, Earle underwent X-ray treatments. His eyesight returned, although it has been speculated that the treatment may have stopped his growth.

=== Sideshow performer ===
While touring El Paso, Texas, Ringling Bros. offered Earle a one-year contract, which turned into fourteen years of employment. During his time with the Ringling Bros., Earle met most of the giants who lived during his lifetime.

He stayed with the circus until mid-1940. He was tired of the routine and decided to leave the business. Undecided about his future, he decided to lay the "Pecos Bill" persona to rest and he returned to California.

== Later years ==
He went on to become a Roma Wine Company salesman, working his way up to becoming their public relations specialist. He was billed as "The World's Tallest Travelling Salesman". In addition, Earle was a talented artist and worked in a variety of media, including painting, sculpture, photography, and poetry. In 1952, he published a book of poems titled The Long Shadows. On November 4, 1950, the Saturday Evening Post ran an article titled Life of Giant Jack Earle.

He died in El Paso, Texas, aged 46.
