= Hirotada Ototake =

Japanese writer (born 1976)

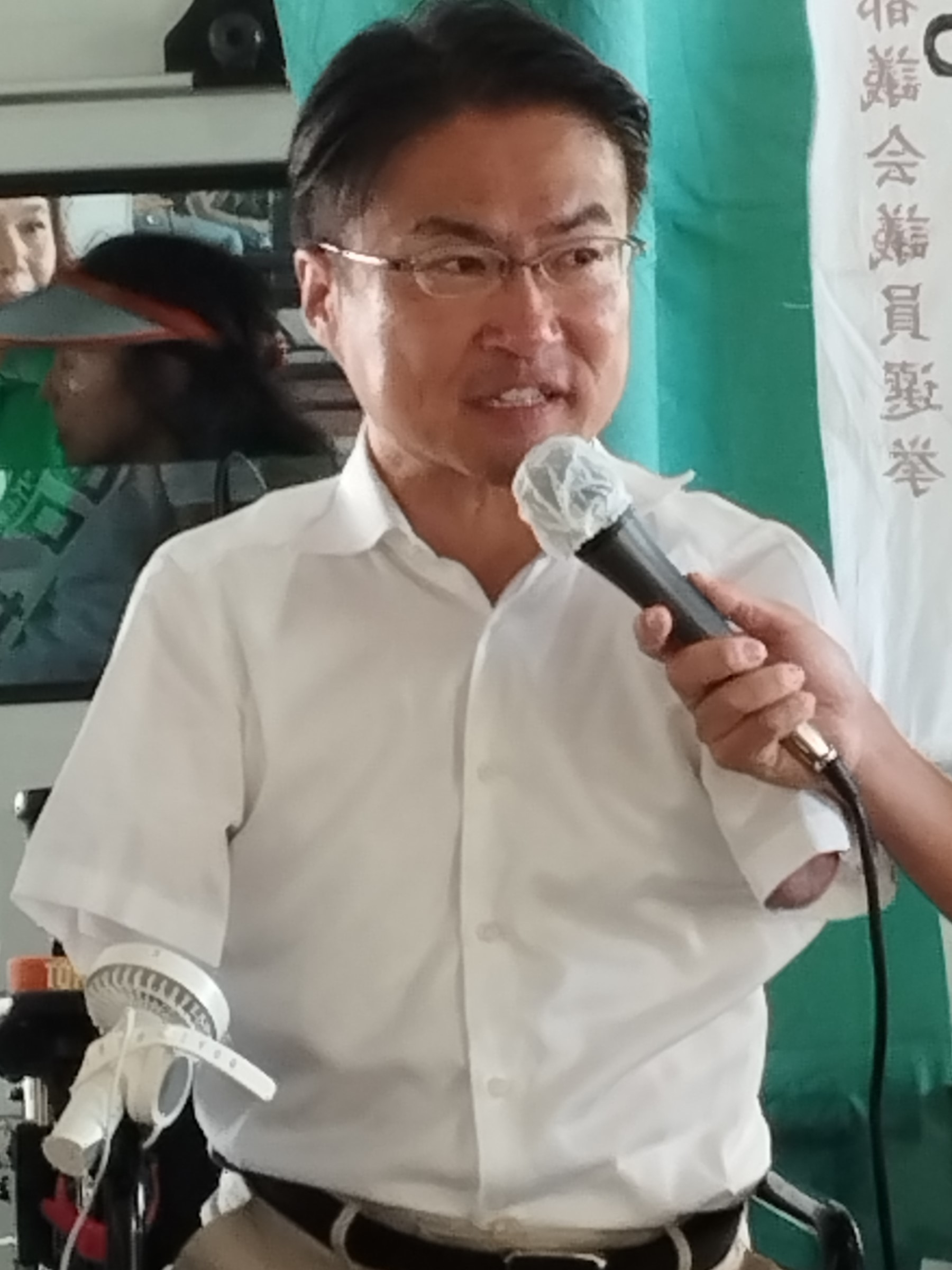
- Hirotada Ototake in 2025
- Born: April 6, 1976 (age 50); Tokyo, Japan
- Occupations: writer, teacher
- Known for: No One's Perfect (Memoir)

Hirotada Ototake (乙武 洋匡, Ototake Hirotada) (born April 6, 1976) is a Japanese writer from Tokyo, who has written in the memoir, fiction and sports journalism genres.

== Biography ==
Ototake was born without arms and legs due to tetra-amelia syndrome, a genetic disorder. Ototake is most notable for his 1998 memoir No One's Perfect (五体不満足, Gotai Fumanzoku) (ISBN 4770027648). Within a year of publication, the book became the third-best-selling book in Japan since World War II. It has since been translated into English.

After publishing his autobiography, Ototake became a successful sports journalist. In 2007, he took a job as a primary school (first through sixth grades) teacher at Suginami Dai-Yon Elementary School in Tokyo. He starred in Daijōbu 3-Gumi (だいじょうぶ3組; English title: Nobody's Perfect), a 2013 film based on the events of his own life as a teacher.

The Liberal Democratic Party considered recruiting Ototake to run in the summer 2016 upper house elections. In 2015, Ototake entered National Graduate Institute for Policy Studies as a Masters student. However, in March 2016, shortly before he was due to complete his graduate studies, the tabloid magazine Shukan Shincho reported that Ototake had affairs with five women since the birth of his eldest son in 2008. He is said to have accompanied a woman in her late 20s on a trip to Tunisia and Paris in late 2015. Ototake acknowledged and apologized for his actions, and did not continue his studies.

On April 8, 2024, Ototake announced that he would run as an independent candidate in the April 28 House of Representatives by-election in the Tokyo No. 15 constituency. The election results showed that he finished in fifth place.

== See also ==
- Nick Vujicic, an Australian motivational speaker and another survivor of tetra-amelia syndrome.
- Joanne O'Riordan, an Irish tetra-amelia syndrome survivor who has addressed the United Nations
- Jennifer Bricker, an American acrobat born without legs
