= Tetra-amelia syndrome =

- Other names: Autosomal recessive tetraamelia
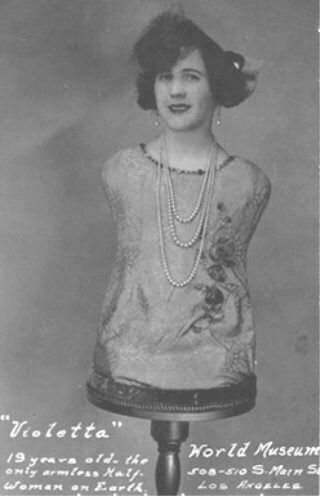
- Violetta, a 1920s sideshow performer with tetra-amelia syndrome

Tetra-amelia syndrome (tetra- + amelia), also called autosomal recessive tetraamelia, is an extremely rare autosomal recessive congenital disorder characterized by the absence of all four limbs. Other areas of the body are also affected by malformations, such as the face, skull, reproductive organs, anus, lungs and pelvis. The disorder can be caused by recessive mutations in the WNT3 or RSPO2 genes.

== Presentation ==
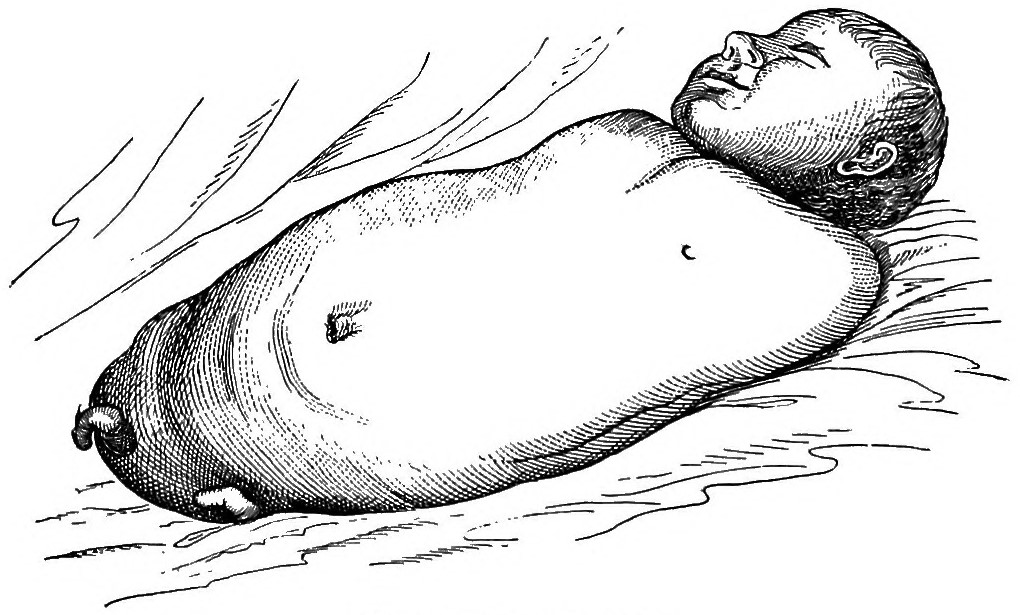
Infant with tetra-amelia syndrome

Tetra-amelia syndrome is characterized by the complete absence of all four limbs. The syndrome causes severe malformations of various parts of the body, including the face and head, heart, nervous system, skeleton, and genitalia. In many cases, the lungs are underdeveloped, which makes breathing difficult or impossible. Because children with tetra-amelia syndrome have such serious medical problems, most are stillborn or die shortly after birth.

== Cause ==
Tetra-amelia syndrome has an autosomal recessive pattern of inheritance.

=== RSPO2 and WNT3 genes ===
Researchers have found loss-of-function mutations in the WNT3 or the RSPO2 genes in people with tetra-amelia syndrome from several consanguineous families. These two gene encode proteins belonging to the WNT pathway which plays critical roles during development.

The protein produced from the WNT3 and RSPO2 genes are involved in the formation of the limbs and other body systems during embryonic development. Mutations in the WNT3 or RSPO2 genes prevent cells from producing functional WNT3 and RSPO2 proteins, which disrupts normal limb formation and leads to the other serious birth defects associated with tetra-amelia syndrome.

According to a 2018 study by Bruno Reversade, the loss of RSPO2, unlike WNT3, also prevents formation of the lungs causing a lethal syndrome of tetra-amelia.

=== Inheritance within families ===
In most of the families reported so far, tetra-amelia syndrome appears to have an autosomal recessive pattern of inheritance. This means the defective gene responsible for the disorder is located on an autosome, and two copies of the defective gene (one inherited from each parent) are required in order to be born with the disorder. The parents of an individual with an autosomal recessive disorder both carry one copy of the defective gene, but usually do not experience any signs or symptoms of the disorder.

== Epidemiology ==
Tetra-amelia syndrome has been reported in only a few families worldwide. According to a 2011 study by Bermejo-Sanchez, amelia – that is, the lacking of one or more limbs – occurs in roughly 1 out of every 71,000 pregnancies.

== People with tetra-amelia syndrome ==
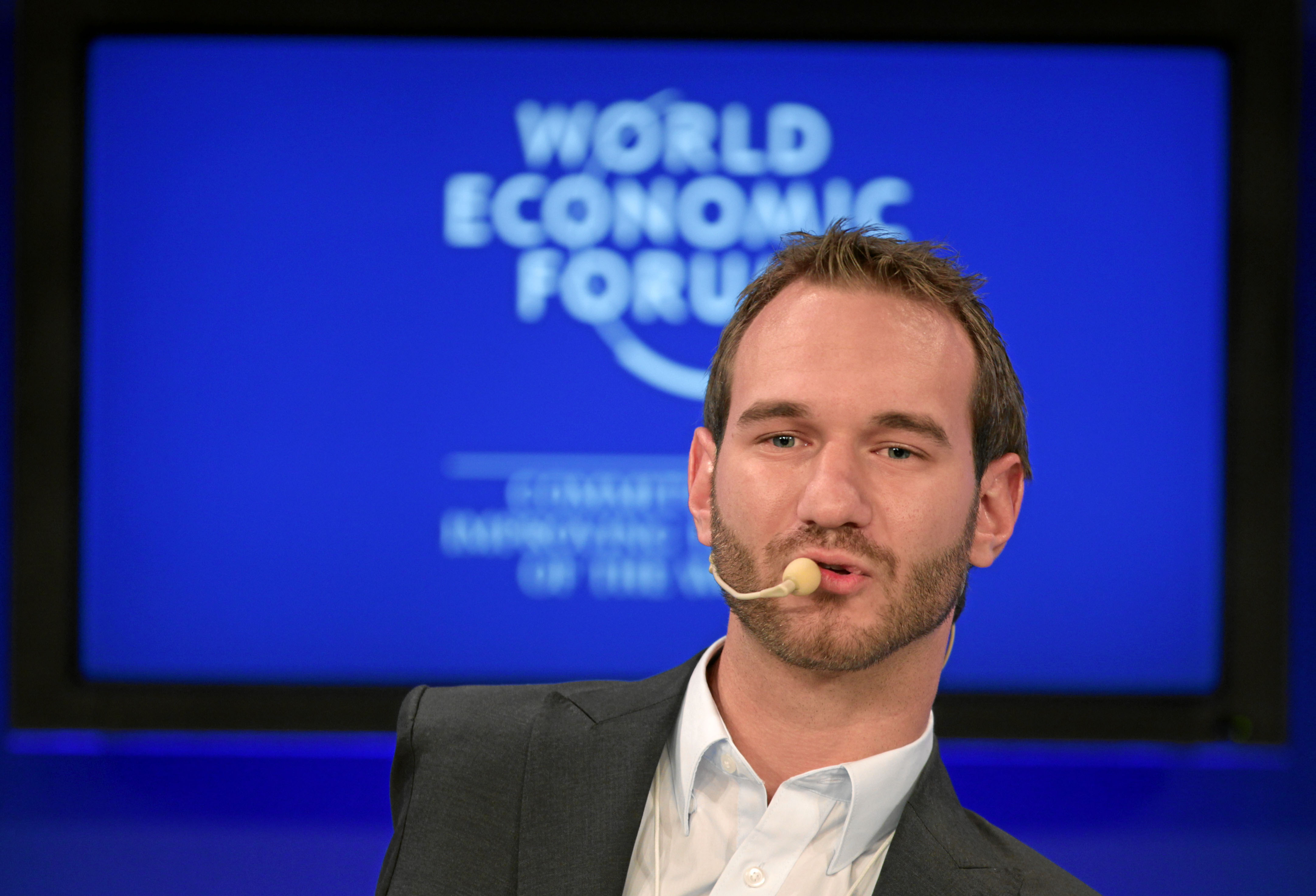
Nick Vujicic, a motivational speaker who was born with tetra-amelia syndrome, speaking during the session "Inspired for a Lifetime" at the Annual Meeting 2011 of the World Economic Forum in Davos, Switzerland, on 30 January 2011

- Joanne O'Riordan (born 1996), Irish activist and sports journalist. At the age of 16 she addressed the United Nations in New York. She appeared before the International Telecommunication Union's conference 'Girls in Technology', receiving a standing ovation after delivering the keynote speech.
- Hirotada Ototake (born 1976), Japanese sportswriter
- Nick Vujicic (born 1982), the founder of Life Without Limbs; motivational speaker and evangelist from Australia and America.
- Prince Randian (1871–1934), Guyanese-born American performer and a famous limbless sideshow performer of the early 1900s, best known for his ability to roll cigarettes with his lips
- Violetta (performer) (born 1905–1906, died 1973)
