= Joanne O'Riordan =

Irish activist and sports journalist

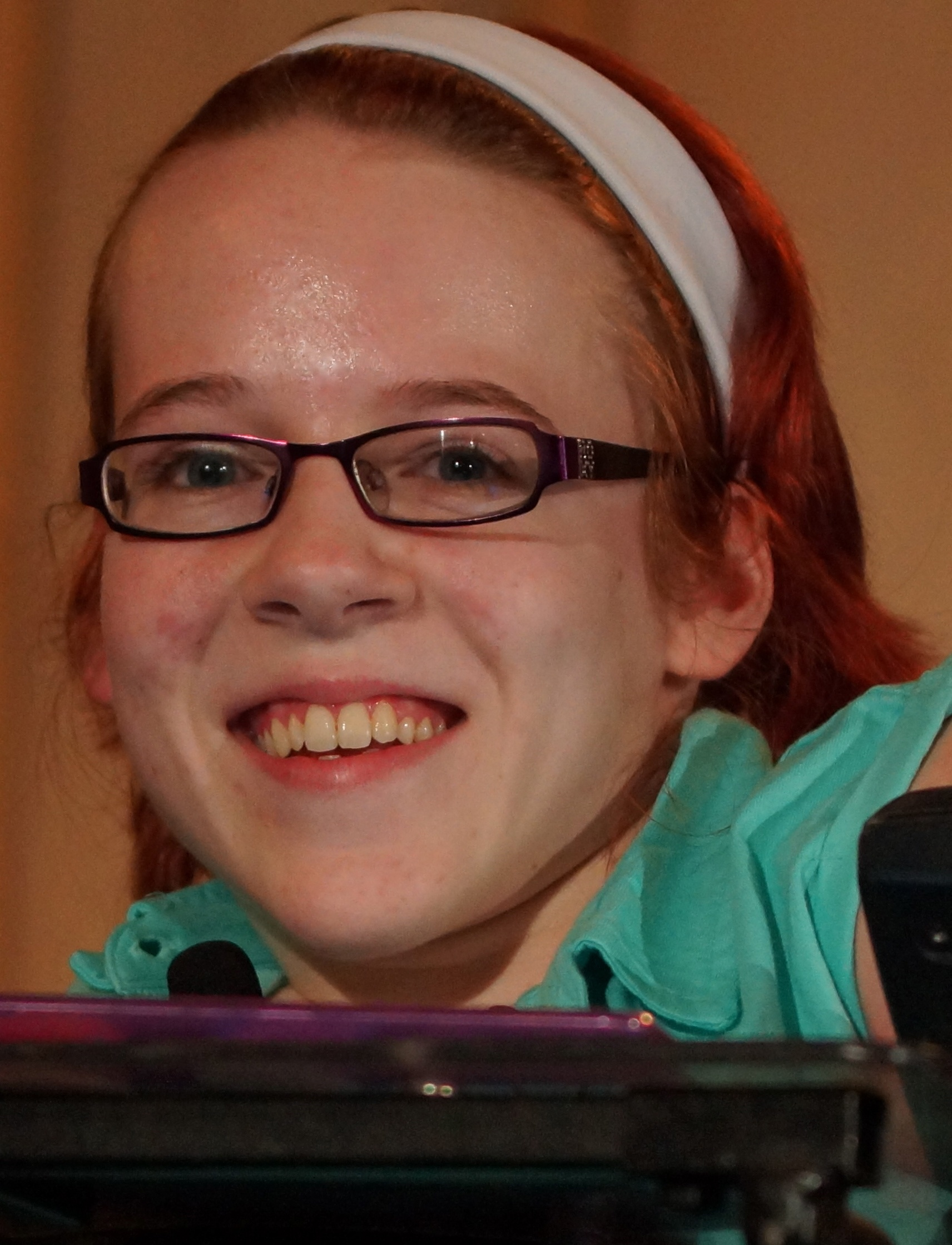
- O'Riordan in 2012
- Born: 24 April 1996 (age 30); Cork, Ireland
- Awards: Cork Person of the Month; Young Person of the Year

Joanne O'Riordan (born 24 April 1996) is an Irish activist and sports journalist who contributes to The Irish Times. From Millstreet in County Cork, she is one of seven currently living people born with the condition tetra-amelia syndrome. She has addressed the United Nations and discussed technology with Massachusetts Institute of Technology (MIT) and Apple. She was named "Person of the Year" in both 2012 and 2013.

== Early life ==
Joanne O'Riordan was born in 1996 in Millstreet, County Cork with tetra-amelia syndrome. She became a campaigner for disability rights in 2011. She used to swim as a child but stopped as a teenager as she had a titanium rod placed in her back to help with scoliosis.

== Activism ==
After developing "a random obsession" with Fine Gael leader and prospective Taoiseach Enda Kenny, she took the morning off school to meet Kenny during the 2011 Irish general election campaign. Kenny was filmed vowing that he would not reduce disability funding if elected. Upon election, Kenny cut disability funding and O'Riordan wrote a letter of disappointment. Her public confrontation with Enda Kenny contributed to O'Riordan's increased profile. The government later reversed its decision. She later explained: "I thought Enda Kenny was a cool guy, you know, he always seemed really relaxed, and easy going. So I only went up for a picture and one of our local people from home was like 'why don't you ask him about people with disabilities', so I did and the local television were recording because it was a big thing for Millstreet, our Future Taoiseach coming. I suppose it was one really small thing that you just do and it just turned into a big thing."

An invitation to appear on The Late Late Show followed. This brought her further attention. Ahead of her second appearance in June 2012, The Irish Times described O'Riordan as "one of the guests on the show in recent years who has made the most impact on viewers".

In April 2012, O'Riordan spoke before the United Nations in New York City, giving an address on the use of technology and challenging those present to build a robot for her to use. A standing ovation followed.

Her brother Steven made a film of her life, titled No Limbs No Limits.

== Awards and honours ==
O'Riordan has received a Cork Person of the Month award, having been nominated by MEP Brian Crowley. In September 2012, she was named Young Person of the Year at Ireland's People of the Year Awards.

In 2014, she was awarded the Junior Chamber International Outstanding Young Person of the Year award. She was Grand Marshall at Dublin's St Patrick's Festival parade in 2016, the youngest ever.

== See also ==
- List of People of the Year Award winners
