= WNT3 =

Protein and coding gene in humans

Identifiers
- Aliases: WNT3, INT4, TETAMS, Wnt family member 3
- External IDs: OMIM: 165330; MGI: 98955; GeneCards: WNT3

Gene location (Human)
Chr.	Chromosome 17 (human)
Band	17q21.31-q21.32	Start	46,762,506 bp
Band	17q21.31-q21.32	End	46,833,154 bp

Gene location (Mouse)
Chr.	Chromosome 11 (mouse)
Band	11 E1|11 67.5 cM	Start	103,664,976 bp
Band	11 E1|11 67.5 cM	End	103,708,783 bp
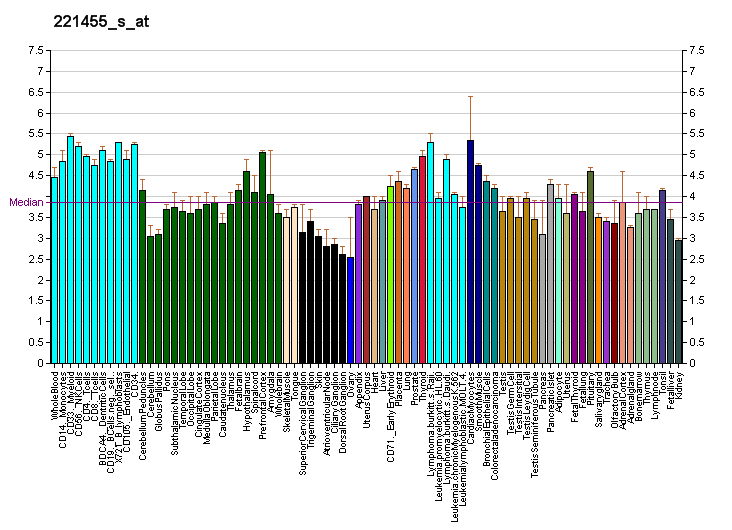
RNA expression pattern
Bgee	Human / Mouse (ortholog); Top expressed in: skin of abdomen; hypothalamus; testicle; anterior cingulate cortex; skin of leg; right frontal lobe; dorsolateral prefrontal cortex; substantia nigra; right lobe of liver; gonad / Top expressed in: surface ectoderm; rhombic lip; labioscrotal swelling; lip; pretectal area; intestinal villus; Ileal epithelium; embryo; embryo; embryonic organizer; More reference expression data
BioGPS	More reference expression data
Gene ontology
Molecular function	receptor ligand activity; protein domain specific binding; frizzled binding; protein binding; signaling receptor binding
Cellular component	cytoplasm; endocytic vesicle membrane; Wnt signalosome; endoplasmic reticulum lumen; plasma membrane; extracellular region; Golgi lumen; extracellular exosome; extracellular space; extracellular matrix
Biological process	cellular response to retinoic acid; cell fate commitment; Spemann organizer formation at the anterior end of the primitive streak; head morphogenesis; limb bud formation; mammary gland epithelium development; anatomical structure formation involved in morphogenesis; mesoderm formation; positive regulation of collateral sprouting in absence of injury; negative regulation of axon extension involved in axon guidance; dorsal/ventral axis specification; axon guidance; limb development; multicellular organism development; positive regulation of Wnt signaling pathway; gamete generation; canonical Wnt signaling pathway involved in mesenchymal stem cell differentiation; canonical Wnt signaling pathway involved in osteoblast differentiation; cell morphogenesis; canonical Wnt signaling pathway; anterior/posterior axis specification; embryonic forelimb morphogenesis; anterior/posterior pattern specification; embryonic hindlimb morphogenesis; Wnt signaling pathway; positive regulation of gene expression; regulation of neurogenesis; stem cell proliferation; canonical Wnt signaling pathway involved in midbrain dopaminergic neuron differentiation; canonical Wnt signaling pathway involved in stem cell proliferation; neuron differentiation; regulation of signaling receptor activity
Sources:Amigo / QuickGO
Orthologs
Databases	NCBI: entry; OMA: entry
Species	Human	Mouse
Entrez	7473	22415
Ensembl	ENSG00000108379; ENSG00000277641; ENSG00000277626	ENSMUSG00000000125
UniProt	P56703	P17553
RefSeq (mRNA)	NM_030753	NM_009521
RefSeq (protein)	NP_110380	NP_033547
Location (UCSC)	Chr 17: 46.76 – 46.83 Mb	Chr 11: 103.66 – 103.71 Mb
PubMed search
- Wikidata
View/Edit Human	View/Edit Mouse

Proto-oncogene protein Wnt-3 is a protein that in humans is encoded by the WNT3 gene.

The WNT gene family consists of structurally related genes that encode secreted signaling proteins. These proteins have been implicated in oncogenesis and in several developmental processes, including regulation of cell fate and patterning during embryogenesis. This gene is a member of the WNT gene family. It encodes a protein showing 98% amino acid identity to mouse Wnt3 protein, and 84% to human WNT3A protein, another WNT gene product. The mouse studies show the requirement of Wnt3 in primary axis formation in the mouse. Studies of the gene expression suggest that this gene may play a key role in some cases of human breast, rectal, lung, and gastric cancer through activation of the WNT-beta-catenin-TCF signaling pathway. This gene is clustered with WNT15, another family member, in the chromosome 17q21 region.
