= Nick Vujicic =

Australian American evangelist (born 1982)

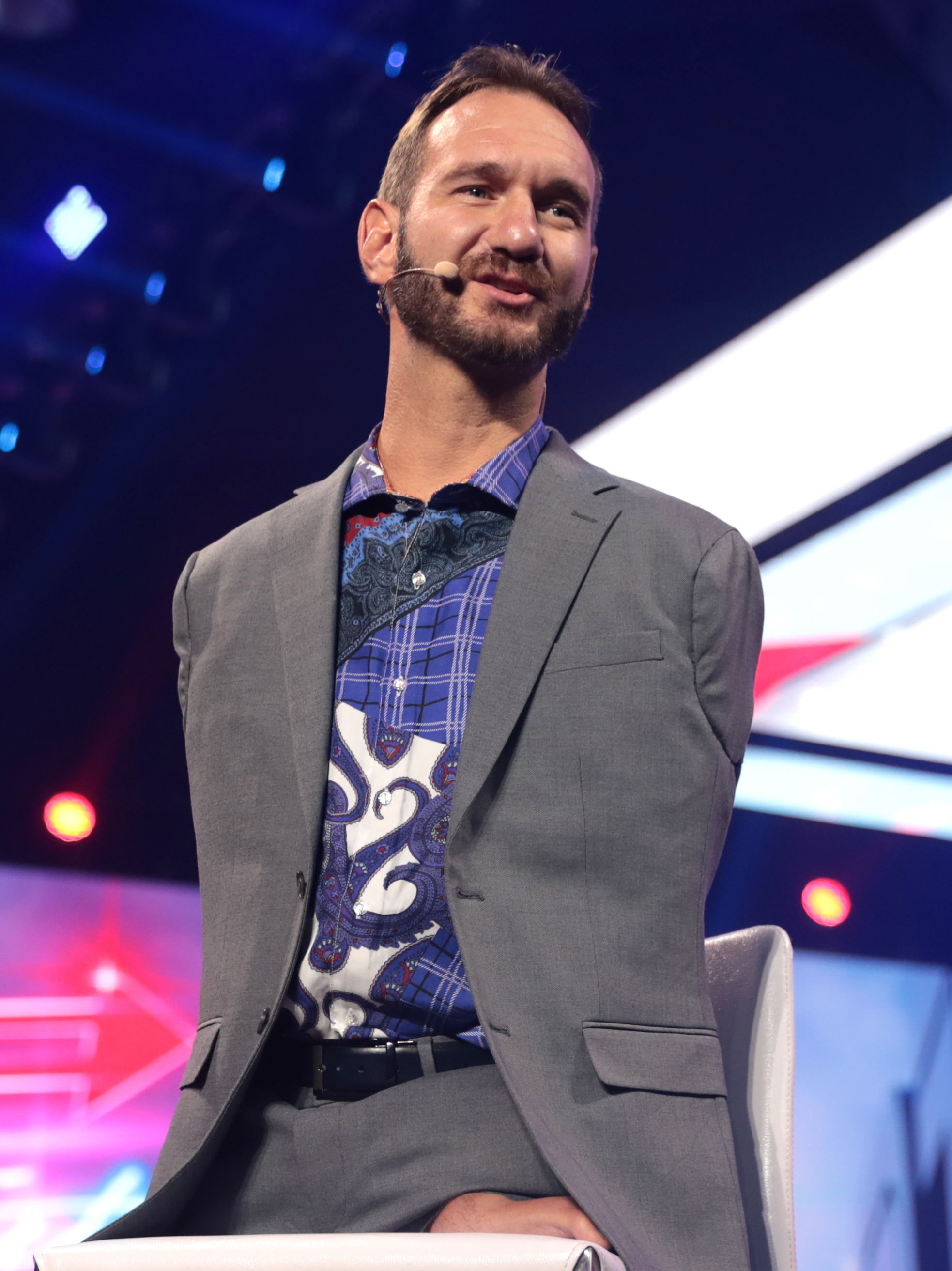
- Vujicic in 2021
- Born: Nicholas James Vujicic; 4 December 1982 (age 43); Melbourne, Victoria, Australia
- Citizenship: Australia; United States
- Education: Griffith University
- Occupations: Evangelist; motivational speaker
- Years active: 2004–present
- Spouse: Kanae Miyahara (m. 2012)
- Children: 4
- Website: nickvujicic.com

Nicholas James Vujicic (/ˈvuːɪtʃɪtʃ/ VOO-itch-itch; born 4 December 1982), known as Nick Vujicic, is an Australian and American evangelist and motivational speaker. Vujicic has tetra-amelia syndrome, a condition characterised by the absence of arms and legs.

== Early life ==
Vujicic was born in Melbourne, Australia, in 1982 to Dušanka and Borislav Vujičić, Serbian immigrants from Yugoslavia. He was raised Serbian Orthodox in his earliest years, but the family later converted to Protestantism. Vujicic's father is a pastor in the Apostolic Christian Church. Vujicic was born with tetra-amelia syndrome, a rare disability characterised by the absence of arms and legs.

According to Vujicic's autobiography, his mother refused to see him or hold him immediately after his birth; instead, she and her husband left the hospital. He was bullied at school because of his medical condition. At one point, Vujicic attempted suicide by drowning himself in a bathtub, but he was saved. While Vujicic's parents initially struggled with grief and confusion about his condition, they "raised him to look at the bright side of life".

Although Vujicic has no arms at all, he cannot be called legless: he has one partial foot with two toes which originally were fused. An operation was performed to separate the toes so that he can use them as fingers. Vujicic refers to this foot as his "chicken drumstick". This foot became his "universal limb": he uses it to walk, jump, write, type, swim, surf and skateboard.

When Vujicic was 17 years old, he started giving inspirational talks at school and church-sponsored events.

Vujicic graduated from Griffith University at the age of 21 with a Bachelor of Commerce degree, with a double major in accountancy and financial planning.

== Ministry of Nick ==
Vujicic travels and speaks about his testimony of faith in Jesus Christ. His ministry is known as Life Without Limbs. As of 2008, the ministry was based in southern California.

Vujicic appeared on the American news programme 20/20 in 2008.

Vujicic starred in the short film The Butterfly Circus (2009). At the 2010 Method Fest Independent Film Festival, he was awarded Best Actor in a Short Film for his starring performance.

Vujicic's first book, Life Without Limits: Inspiration for a Ridiculously Good Life, was published by Random House in 2010 and has been translated into 30 languages.

Vujicic is opposed to abortion. In 2021, he co-founded ProLife Bank.

In 2022, Vujicic launched a new ministry initiative called "Champions for the Brokenhearted". The goal of the project is to "support particular disaffected groups in need".

== Personal life ==
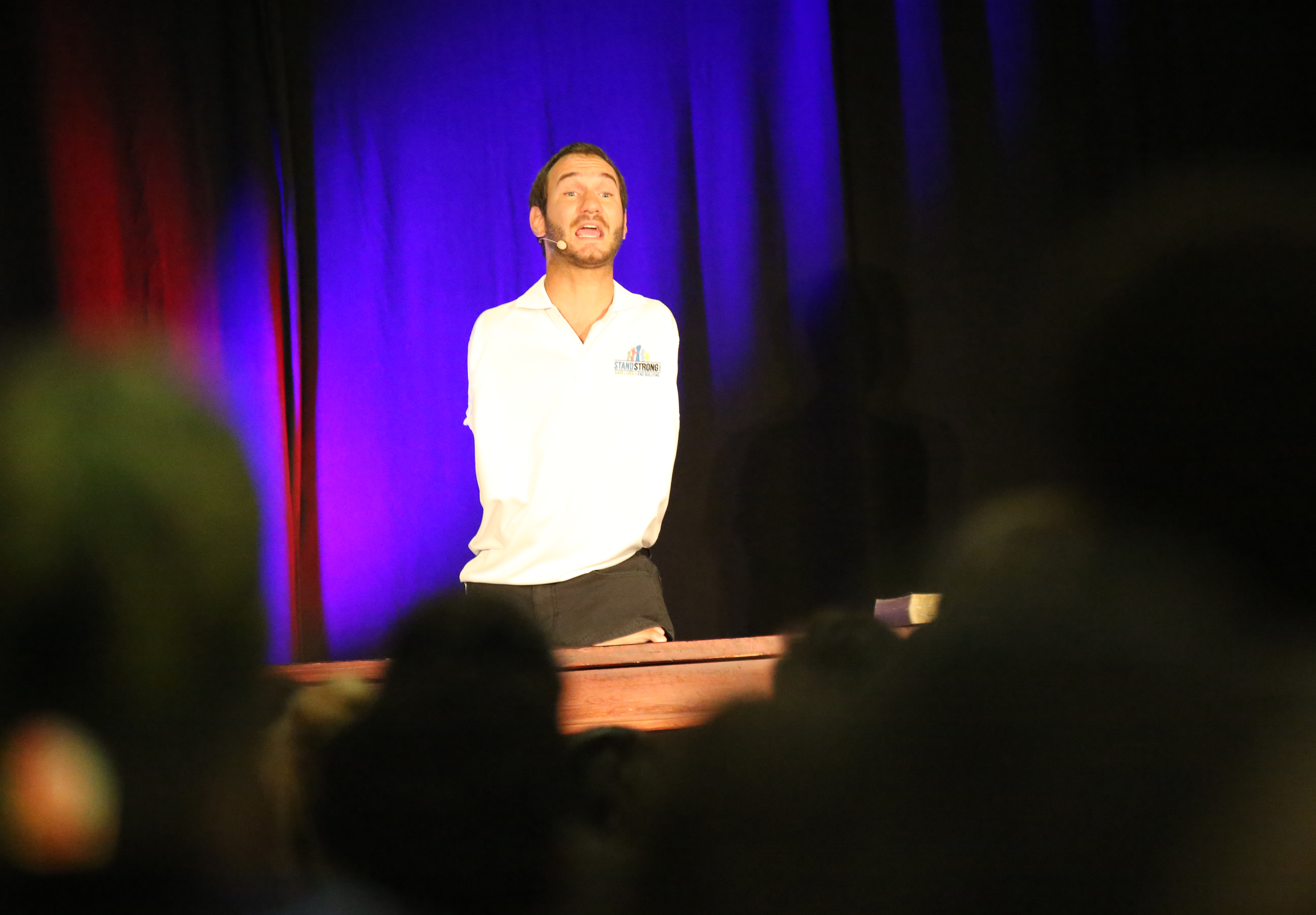
Vujicic speaking to students in Florida in 2015

Vujicic married Kanae Miyahara on 12 February 2012. As of 2017, Vujicic and his wife have two sons and two daughters.

== Books and publications ==
- Life Without Limits: Inspiration for a Ridiculously Good Life (2007; ISBN 978-0307589743
- Your Life Without Limits (2012); ISBN 978-0307731043
- Limitless: Devotions for a Ridiculously Good Life (2013); ISBN 978-0307730916
- Unstoppable: The Incredible Power of Faith in Action (2013); ISBN 978-0307730893
- The Power of Unstoppable Faith (2014); ISBN 978-1601426765
- Stand Strong (2015); ISBN 978-1601427823
- Love Without Limits (2016); ISBN 978-1601426185
- Be the Hands and Feet: Living Out God's Love for All His Children, 13 February 2018; ISBN 978-1601426208

== See also ==
- Jennifer Bricker, an American acrobat born without legs
- Hirotada Ototake, a Japanese sports writer and survivor of tetra-amelia syndrome
- Joanne O'Riordan, an Irish Tetra-amelia syndrome survivor
- Zion Clark, a professional wrestler with no legs and a survivor of Caudal regression syndrome
