= Barroz (soundtrack) =

2024 soundtrack album

- Soundtrack album cover

Soundtrack album by Lydian Nadhaswaram, Fernando Boto de Jesus Guerreiro and Miguel Jorge Guerreiro
- Released: 20 December 2024
- Recorded: 2020–2024
- Studio: Amly Studios, Chennai; YRF Studios, Mumbai; Fames Project, Skopje; Abbey Road Studios, London
- Genre: Feature film soundtrack; western classical; orchestral; fado
- Length: 19:39
- Language: Malayalam; Portuguese; English
- Label: Sony Music

Singles from Barroz
- 1. "Isabella" Released: 13 December 2024

Barroz is the soundtrack album to the 2024 Indian children's fantasy film of the same name directed by Mohanlal in his directorial debut, who also starred in the titular character. The film's soundtrack consisted of five original songs in both Malayalam and Portuguese languages. Lydian Nadhaswaram (in his film music debut) composed three songs with the lyrics written by Vinayak Sasikumar, Lakshmi Sreekumar and Krishnadas Panki, with Fernando Boto de Jesus Guerreiro and Miguel Jorge Guerreiro composed music and lyrics for the fado songs.

The soundtrack was released under the Sony Music India label on 20 December 2024.

== Development ==
During the film's pre-production in 2019, Mohanlal hired 13-year-old Chennai-based multi-instrumentalist Lydian Nadhaswaram for composing the film's music, a child prodigy who won the CBS reality talent show The World's Best that year. His involvement was confirmed in September 2019, at an event to felicitate the success of Mohanlal's Odiyan (2018) and Lucifer (2019), where Mohanlal launched the film officially and invited him as a part of the technical crew. In February 2023, Mohanlal took to social media to announce that South African composer Mark Kilian, known for his work in Hollywood films, has been brought on board to compose the musical score.

Nadashwaram started composing the film's music in early 2020. In February 2024, he started recording the orchestral portions at the Fames Project in Skojpe, North Macedonia, which was performed by Fames Project Studio Orchestra conducted by Andrew T. Mackay. On 15 March 2024, Mohanlal paid a surprise visit to Amly Studios in Chennai, where the film's song recording happened.

The lyrics were provided by Vinayak Sasikumar, Lakshmi Sreekumar, and Krishnadas Panki. The film also featured the Portuguese fado songs which were composed and co-written by Fernando Boto de Jesus Guerreiro and Miguel Jorge Guerreiro. Mohanlal stated that as the story had a Portuguese connection, he composed the melancholic folk numbers which are related to ocean.

== Release ==
The audio rights were acquired by Sony Music India. On 13 December 2024, the first song "Isabella" was released as a single with vocals by Mohanlal. Unlike a lyrical video, the song was released in the behind-the-scenes format which included the recording of the vocals by Mohanlal, and composition of the orchestral portions. The Hindi version of the song was performed by Shaan. The soundtrack was released under the Sony Music India on 20 December.

== Track listing ==
Malayalam
No.	Title	Lyrics	Music	Singer(s)	Length
1.	"Maname"	Lakshmi Sreekumar	Lydian Nadhaswaram	Mohanlal, Anamika PS	4:21
2.	"Isabella"	Vinayak Sasikumar	Lydian Nadhaswaram	Mohanlal	5:42
3.	"Bambooziya"	Krishnadas Panki	Lydian Nadhaswaram	Mohanlal, Anjana Padmanabhan, Amirthavarshini	4:49
4.	"A Legend Reborn"	Fernando Boto de Jesus Guerreiro, Lakshmi Sreekumar	Fernando Boto de Jesus Guerreiro	Helena Filipa da Rosa Candeias	2:39
5.	"The Story Retold"	Miguel Jorge Guerreiro, Lakshmi Sreekumar	Miguel Jorge Guerreiro	Telma Marisa Simão dos Santos	2:06
Total length:					19:39

Tamil
No.	Title	Lyrics	Music	Singer(s)	Length
1.	"Maname"	A. P. Raja	Lydian Nadhaswaram	Madhu Balakrishnan, Amirthavarshini	4:26
2.	"Isabella"	A. P. Raja	Lydian Nadhaswaram	Madhu Balakrishnan	5:43
3.	"Bambooziya"	A. P. Raja	Lydian Nadhaswaram	Amirthavarshini	3:14
4.	"A Legend Reborn"	Fernando Boto de Jesus Guerreiro, Lakshmi Sreekumar	Fernando Boto de Jesus Guerreiro	Helena Filipa da Rosa Candeias	2:39
5.	"The Story Retold"	Miguel Jorge Guerreiro, Lakshmi Sreekumar	Miguel Jorge Guerreiro	Telma Marisa Simão dos Santos	2:06
Total length:					18:09

Telugu
No.	Title	Lyrics	Music	Singer(s)	Length
1.	"Manase"	Vanamali	Lydian Nadhaswaram	Amirthavarshini, Varshan Sathish	4:22
2.	"Isabella"	Vanamali	Lydian Nadhaswaram	Varshan Sathish	5:42
3.	"Bambooziya"	Vanamali	Lydian Nadhaswaram	Amirthavarshini	3:14
4.	"A Legend Reborn"	Fernando Boto de Jesus Guerreiro, Lakshmi Sreekumar	Fernando Boto de Jesus Guerreiro	Helena Filipa da Rosa Candeias	2:39
5.	"The Story Retold"	Miguel Jorge Guerreiro, Lakshmi Sreekumar	Miguel Jorge Guerreiro	Telma Marisa Simão dos Santos	2:06
Total length:					18:04

Kannada
No.	Title	Lyrics	Music	Singer(s)	Length
1.	"Manave"	Pratap Bhatt	Lydian Nadhaswaram	Spoorthi Rao, Ajay Murugan	4:24
2.	"Isabella"	Pratap Bhatt	Lydian Nadhaswaram	Ajay Murugan	5:41
3.	"Bambooziya"	Pratap Bhatt	Lydian Nadhaswaram	Spoorthi Rao, Amirthavarshini	3:14
4.	"A Legend Reborn"	Fernando Boto de Jesus Guerreiro, Lakshmi Sreekumar	Fernando Boto de Jesus Guerreiro	Helena Filipa da Rosa Candeias	2:39
5.	"The Story Retold"	Miguel Jorge Guerreiro, Lakshmi Sreekumar	Miguel Jorge Guerreiro	Telma Marisa Simão dos Santos	2:06
Total length:					18:06

Hindi
No.	Title	Lyrics	Music	Singer(s)	Length
1.	"Maname"	Runa Rizvi	Lydian Nadhaswaram	Balram, Uthara Unnikrishnan	5:42
2.	"Isabella"	Runa Rizvi	Lydian Nadhaswaram	Shaan	5:42
3.	"Bambooziya"	Runa Rizvi	Lydian Nadhaswaram	Amirthavarshini	4:49
4.	"A Legend Reborn"	Fernando Boto de Jesus Guerreiro, Lakshmi Sreekumar	Fernando Boto de Jesus Guerreiro	Helena Filipa da Rosa Candeias	2:39
5.	"The Story Retold"	Miguel Jorge Guerreiro, Lakshmi Sreekumar	Miguel Jorge Guerreiro	Telma Marisa Simão dos Santos	2:06
Total length:					19:39

== Personnel ==
- Music composer, arranger, programmer: Lydian Nadhaswaram, Fernando Boto de Jesus Guerreiro and Miguel Jorge Guerreiro
- Orchestra: Fame's Skopje Studio Orchestra, Skopje, North Macedonia
- Orchestra conductor: Oleg Kondratenko
- Orchestra co-ordinators: Andrew T Mackay, Joshua Rodrigues
- Backing vocals: Lydian Nadhaswaram, Varshan Sathish, Amirthavarshini
- Live rhythms: Sivamani, Lydian Nadhaswaram
- Acoustic, bass guitar, mandolin, tabla, piano, electronic rhythm and keyboard programming: Lydian Nadhaswaram
- Bansuri, key flute: Amirthavarshini & S Akash
- Violin: Ananthakrrishnan
- Recording studios: Amly Studios, YRF Studios, Fames Project Skopje
- Engineers: A. Vairavasan, Lydian Nadhaswaram, Marina
- Mixing: A. Vairavasan at Amly Studios, Chennai
- Mastering: Andrew T. Mackay at Abbey Road Studios, London
- Music supervisor: Amirthavarshini
- Studio manager: Archana Kaleeswaran
