= Aditi Sanwal =

Indian television actress

- Aditi in 2025
- Born: Aditi; Jhansi, Uttar Pradesh, India
- Education: M. S. Ramaiah Medical College
- Occupation: Actress
- Years active: 2019–present

Aditi Sanwal is an Indian actress who works in films and television.

== Early life and education ==
Sanwal is from Jhansi, Uttar Pradesh. She completed her MBBS degree from M. S. Ramaiah Medical College, Bangalore.

== Career ==
Sanwal made her debut with various TV commercials followed by her television debut in 2019 by playing the lead role of Rajkumari Durdhara in Chandragupta Maurya. In 2020, she portrayed Kukki Bajaj in the show Kasautii Zindagii Kay. She played the lead role of Kashvi Sahay in fantasy series Baalveer 3 and Baalveer 4. She made her web debut with Operation MBBS 2 as Lata. She has worked in films like Aye Watan Mere Watan, Saale Aashiq and Pintu Ki Pappi.

== Filmography ==
=== Films ===
Year	Title	Role
2024	Ae Watan Mere Watan	Antara
2025	Pintu Ki Pappi	Aditi
2025	Saale Aashiq	Meena

=== Television ===
Year	Title	Role	Notes	Ref.
2019	Chandragupta Maurya	Durdhara	Lead	
2020	Kasautii Zindagii Kay	Kukki Bajaj	Parallel Lead	
2022	Wagle Ki Duniya – Nayi Peedhi Naye Kissey	Dr. Prabha Shah	Guest appearance	
2023	Baalveer 3	Kaashvi Sahay	Lead	
2024	Deewani	Meera Tiwari	Lead	
2024	Baalveer 4	Kaashvi Sahay	Lead	
2025	Baalveer 5	Kaashvi Sahay	Lead	
2025–2026	Kyunki Saas Bhi Kabhi Bahu Thi 2	Mitali Sarabhai		
2026	Kyunki Rishton Ke Bhi Roop Badalte Hain	Mitali Sarabhai		

=== Web series ===
Year	Title	Role	Notes	Ref.
2021	Operation MBBS	Lata		
