= Dai Andrews =

American performance and visual artist (born 1977)

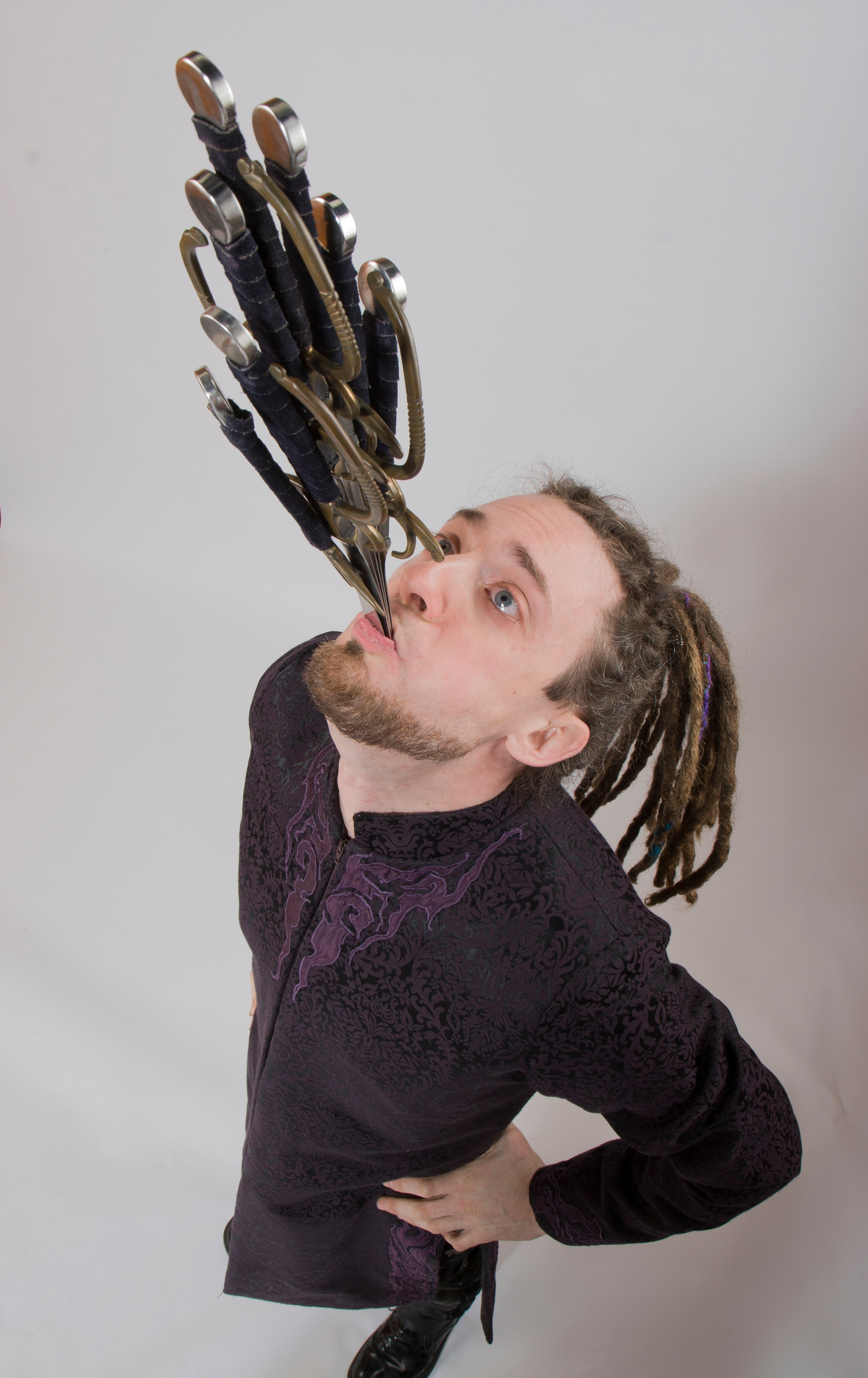
- Born: David Matthew Andrews; December 22, 1977 (age 48); Virginia, United States
- Occupations: Fakir, sword swallower, martial artist, performer
- Known for: Sword swallowing

Dai Andrews (born David Matthew Andrews, December 22, 1977) is an American performance and visual artist, motivational speaker, director, producer, martial artist, and multiple Guinness World Record holder. He is also the proprietor of Dream Machine Arts and Unforgettable Entertainment, both entertainment agencies based in Baltimore, Maryland, United States.

== Career ==
Dai Andrews first became interested in stage magic upon receiving a magic set for his fifth birthday. In 1994, at age 17, Andrews was recruited to demonstrate and sell magic kits at a small magic shop at Tysons Corner Mall. The store relocated to Disney World within days of his hiring, and Andrews declined to move with the store. He accepted a box of used magic tricks as a severance package. Andrews later learned performance arts such as fire eating, escape artistry and sword swallowing.

In 1996 he traveled to Europe to work as a street performer. He made television appearances in several countries and performed as a part of commedia dell'arte in Italy. While in Europe, Andrews picked up the idea of swallowing a curved blade from a performer named Wasp Boy at England's Circus of Horrors.

He later returned to America, where he began performing at nightclubs, corporate events, renaissance festivals, casinos and colleges. He was also a featured entertainer for Carnival Cruise Lines for six years.

Andrews has performed on five continents in more than thirty countries. He has given numerous performances for television, Ripley's Believe It or Not! Odditoriums, several Las Vegas casinos including The Luxor and the New York, New York and major rock and roll festivals like the M3 Festival and the Outlaw Jam, where in 2010 he opened for Blue Öyster Cult on the main stage for an audience of more than 10,000.

Andrews produces and directs many of his own performances including the theatrical séance "An Experience in Spirit Theater", and "Modern Fakir".

== Acts ==
Andrews has traveled throughout the world to study martial arts. He studied yoga and mediation with sadhus in the Himalayas and elsewhere in India. He has also studied kung fu in China and Muay Thai in Thailand. He learned sword swallowing as a young teenager from a mysterious American sword swallower in Pennsylvania, who was known as Dobbs. Dobbs disappeared while sailing in the Caribbean shortly after teaching Andrews.

Performances given by Andrews include:

- Sword Swallowing - 120-degree curved sword, swallowing up to fifteen swords at once, the swallowing of a red hot sword.
- Iron Body Chi Gung - Bending steel re-bar spears and breaking arrows with the throat, the bed of blades, the man who can't be hung.
- Iron Palm Chi Gung - Breaking boards and steel bars with bare hands.
- Traditional Fakir Demonstrations - The human blockhead, bed of nails, the human pincushion, fire eating.
- Escape Artistry - Straitjackets, chains, handcuffs, 100 ft of rope challenge escape.

== World records ==
On August 30, 2002, at the 2002 Sword Swallowers Convention in Wilkes-Barre, Pennsylvania, 19 sword swallowers including Andrews, (who swallowed 11 at once) swallowed 50 swords simultaneously. These records were certified as official Guinness World Records for Most Swords Swallowed Simultaneously and Most Sword Swallowers Swallowing Swords Simultaneously in 2004.

Andrews previously held the official Guinness World Record Largest Curve in a sword swallowed, on September 12, 2009, at Pimlico Race Course in Baltimore, Maryland, US, Andrews swallowed a sword that was curved 120 degrees from point to hilt. This record was certified as an official Guinness World Record in 2009. On January 9, 2017, Franz Huber beat Andrew's record by swallowing a sword with a 133-degree curve.

== Television and media appearances ==
Dai Andrews had made more than 50 television appearances worldwide including:

- ABC's Jimmy Kimmel Live!
- An internationally broadcast story on sword swallowing by CNN
- Shocked and Amazed on the Travel Channel
- TBS's Movie Break
- NatGeo Amazing on the National Geographic Channel
- Stomachs of Steel documentary on the Discovery Channel
- NEXT on CNN
- Strange Tales of the Flesh on Discovery Canada
- Deadline! on HD Net
- Tarrent on TV (UK)

His appearances in print media include:

- The 2012 edition of The Guinness Book of World Records
- The Daredevil's Manual a book by Ben Ikenson
- Time
- Los Angeles Times
- The Washington Post
- Bizarre
- Gothic Beauty
- Mental Floss

== Medical research ==
In 2007 Andrews worked alongside Dr. Sharon Caplan and other physicians at Johns Hopkins University in Baltimore, Maryland, US. The study was conducted to determine whether the techniques involved in sword swallowing could be used to help patients who suffer from achalasia or those who had suffered severe throat trauma and were having trouble swallowing as a result. The fluoroscopic video can be seen online.

== Martial arts ==
Andrews teaches the xingyiquan style of internal kung fu as well as traditional meditation techniques at a small studio in Baltimore. He is the private student of Grandmaster Huang Chien Lang and has been studying xingyiquan, baguazhang, tai chi and Tien Shan Pai since 2000. He was awarded the rank of first tuan (degree) by the World Kuoshu Federation in July 2008, and the rank of second tuan (degree) in July 2010.

In addition to teaching, Andrews regularly participates in the martial arts community performing at tournaments and fundraisers as well as continuing to deepen his knowledge of the martial arts. In 2010 and 2011 he spent several months living at Wat Chom Tong studying meditation under Acharn Luang Phor Tong and studying with several Muay Thai masters while traveling in Thailand.

== Charitable work ==
Throughout his career, Andrews has often worked in support of charitable organizations including; St. Jude's Children's Hospital, the American Dime Museum, Playa Del Fuego The Maryland Food Bank and the Signal 13 Foundation which was established for police officers and their families that have been injured in the line of duty.

In 2011, Andrews spent time volunteering to teach English and sleight-of-hand magic to underprivileged children at the Phare Ponleu Selpak school in Battambang, Cambodia, while on an extended motorcycle trip across Asia.
