= Atkan Chatkan =

2020 Indian musical drama film directed by Shiv Hare

- Promotional poster
- Directed by: Shiv Hare
- Written by: Shiv Hare
- Produced by: Vishakha Singh; A. R. Rahman
- Starring: Lydian Nadhaswaram; Amit Riyaan; Spruha Shirish Joshi; Yash Rane; Sachin Chaudhary; Tamanna Dipak; Ayesha Vindhara; Tanmay Chaturvedi
- Cinematography: Subhransu Das
- Edited by: Lionel Fernandes
- Music by: Sivamani
- Production company: Lokaa Entertainment
- Distributed by: ZEE5
- Release date: 5 September 2020
- Running time: 126 minutes
- Country: India
- Language: Hindi

Atkan Chatkan is a 2020 Indian Hindi-language musical drama film written and directed by Shiv Hare on his directorial debut. It is produced by Vishakha Singh under Lokaa Entertainment and presented by music composer A. R. Rahman. The film story revolves around Guddu, a chai delivery boy who eventually teams up with three friends and forms a musical band to take part in a musical competition despite the poor background. The film stars newcomer Lydian Nadhaswaram along with Amit Riyaan, Yash Rane, Sachin Chaudhary, Tamanna Dipak and Ayesha Vindhara in the lead roles. The film was premiered via ZEE5 on 5 September 2020 and generally opened to positive reviews from critics.

== Plot ==
The story revolves around a 13 year old Guddu who works as a helper at a tea stall. His father Vishnu (played by Amit Riyaan), an ex musician is a penniless alcoholic, and his mother a singer has abandoned the family. Therefore, he has to take the responsibility of his family at a tender age. Music is his passion, he loves to observe, listen and create new tunes. On his daily chai delivery visits, he watches a wedding band practice keenly, completely losing the sense of time. He has a desire to join the band one day. Along with Guddu, the film also tells the tale of other street children who work near Guddu's tea stall. One day while wandering in the city, they come across a carnival where they see an orchestra performing for money which inspires them to form their own band. Atkan Chatkan shows the dreams of millions of young children who do not have the means but only a burning passion that needs careful nurturing to grow and succeed in life.

== Cast ==
- Lydian Nadhaswaram as Gautam "Guddu" Shivhare
  - Taha Shah Badussha as Adult Guddu
- Amit Riyaan as Vishnu, Guddu's Father
- Spruha Joshi as Mohi Shivhare, Guddu's Mother
- Yash Rane as Madhav Kumar
- Sachin Chaudhary as Chuttan
- Tamanna Dipak as Meethi
- Ayesha Vindhara as Lata
- Saurabh V Pandey
- Ajay Jadhav

== Production ==
The son of music director Varshan Sathish, Lydian Nadhaswaram who rose to prominence as a child prodigy pianist after winning the reality talent show The World's Best was roped into play the main lead in the film. He eventually made his film acting debut through this project. Lydian whose mother tongue was Tamil began shooting for the film despite his inability to speak Hindi fluently. The film was shot predominantly in Jhansi which also coincidentally depicts the name of his mother.

== Soundtrack ==
Track listing
| No. | Title | Music | Singer(s) | Length |
|---|---|---|---|---|
| 1. | "Atkan Chatkan" | Sivamani | Lydian Nadhaswaram; R S Rakthaksh; Idazhiga I | 4:19 |
| 2. | "Daata Shakti de" | Sivamani | Amitabh Bachchan | 3:39 |
| 3. | "Mann Tu" | Sivamani | Sonu Nigam | 5:59 |
| 4. | "Dil Zara" | Sivamani | Hari Haran; Runa Sivamani | 6:18 |
| 5. | "Oh Maa Meri Ma" | Sivamani | Runa Sivamani | 4:38 |
| 6. | "Nar Ho" | Sivamani | Uthara Unnikrishnan | 5:37 |
| 7. | "Kabira" | Sivamani | Uthara Unnikrishnan | 3:55 |
| Total length: | | | | 32.65 |

== Reception ==
Atkan Chatkan upon release received mixed responses from the critics.

Renuka Vyavahare of Times Of India said "In terms of direction and storytelling, Atkan Chatkan is predictable, formulaic and opts for an over-simplistic approach of expression. What makes this film stand out despite its poverty template are the powerful performances of the child actors and Sivamani’s spectacular music" Pradeep Kumar of The Hindu wrote "Lydian Nadhaswaram makes a solid debut and ‘Drums’ Sivamani's soul-lifting tunes are worth checking out, but ‘Atkan Chatkan’ falls flat due to the lack of drama in its storyline" Ektaa malik of The Indian Express wrote "The two-hour-fifteen minute film is the directorial debut of Shiv Hare, and while the earnestness of the attempt was palpable in the trailer, the full-length feature adds nothing more to it" Vibha Maru of India Today had just few positives to mention about the film stating "The film's only highlight is when we see Lydian beat the tunes of Sivamani's music, pouring some excitement into the film. Other child actors like Sachin Choudhary and Yash Rane also give notable performances"
