= Kanithan =

2016 Indian Tamil-language action thriller film by T. N. Santhosh

- Theatrical release poster
- Directed by: T. N. Santosh
- Written by: T. N. Santosh
- Produced by: Kalaippuli S. Thanu
- Starring: Atharvaa; Catherine Tresa; Tarun Arora
- Cinematography: Arvind Krishna
- Edited by: Bhuvan Srinivasan
- Music by: Drums Sivamani
- Distributed by: V Creations
- Release date: 26 February 2016
- Running time: 137 minutes
- Country: India
- Language: Tamil

Kanithan (transl. The Mathematician) is a 2016 Indian Tamil-language action thriller film written and directed by T. N. Santhosh and produced by S. Thanu. The film stars Atharvaa and Catherine Tresa. Sivamani composed the film's music. Having begun production in 2013, the film was released in February 2016. The film was remade in Kannada as Athiratha (2017) and in Telugu as Arjun Suravaram (2019).

== Plot ==
Gowtham Ramalingam is an intelligent TV journalist working at a small news channel. For generations, his family has maintained close ties to broadcasting. His father, Ramalingam, serves as a news presenter on Doordarshan, while his grandfather worked as a newsreader on All India Radio. Although Gowtham is an academically brilliant engineering graduate, he prefers journalism and dreams of joining the BBC. One day, while reporting for his channel, he meets Anu and falls in love with her. Anu turns out to be a colleague at the same television station and reciprocates his affection. Eventually, Gowtham receives an interview offer from the BBC. Despite initial nerves, he performs well during the interview and secures the role. His friends and colleagues, including Anu, celebrate his achievement at the office. However, his happiness shatters when police arrest him for defrauding banks of several lakhs of rupees using forged documents and counterfeit degree certificates. Consequently, his genuine academic credentials and those of numerous other students are invalidated.

While being transported to prison in a police van, a fellow graduate seated beside Gowtham commits suicide by leaping from the moving vehicle into the path of an oncoming truck. Witnessing this tragedy, Gowtham realises that he and the other affected students have been used as pawns in a massive scam. With assistance from his neighbour, a police officer, alongside his lawyer friend Balaji, his colleague Senthil, and Anu, Gowtham secures his release from prison. Because his degree is labelled forged, the BBC revokes his job offer. Determined to clear his name, Gowtham resolves to infiltrate and expose the fake certificate racket alongside his neighbour, Balaji, Senthil, and Anu.

Recalling the forged bank loan papers seen at the police station, Gowtham remembers they bore the same photograph featured on his degree certificate. He deduces that the photo was stolen when he submitted his credentials to a consultancy firm in Anna Nagar. Accompanied by his neighbour, Senthil, and Balaji, Gowtham visits the locked firm, breaks the lock, and searches inside. Hidden in the ceiling, they discover counterfeit degree templates bearing the seals of Anna University, University of Madras, [[Madras Christian College, and several other major universities. The group confiscates the forged certificates and coordinates with multiple television channels, including their own, to broadcast the names of the fake degree holders. This exposure forces the consultancy firms to close, alarming Thura Sarkar, the kingpin behind the phoney certificate scam, and his sons.

To trap the criminal syndicate, Gowtham intentionally puts Balaji's name on the televised list, knowing Thura will target him. The plan succeeds, and Gowtham arrives in time to save Balaji, fighting and killing the attackers, including Thura's son. Anticipating that Thura will visit the crime scene to destroy evidence, Gowtham hides a camera nearby. Thura finds the hidden device and almost executes Gowtham, who escapes with help from his police neighbour. Undeterred, Gowtham goes undercover as a certificate applicant to record the scammers on his mobile phone while Thura tracks down whoever spread the news. When Thura reaches the television office and holds Senthil and the staff hostage, Gowtham phones him and reveals his own whereabouts to save Senthil. Meanwhile, Thura's second son kidnaps Anu, prompting Gowtham to overpower and kill Thura's second son.

Enraged by the loss of his sons, Thura retaliates by brutally murdering Balaji and the police neighbour. Furious, Gowtham vows to end the racket permanently. He sends a colleague disguised as a fake certificate applicant to Thura wearing spectacles fitted with a microcamera, then broadcasts the entire video live on air with Senthil. Thura reaches the station, fights Gowtham, and destroys the transmission terminal, yet the broadcast gets restored anyway. During their struggle, Gowtham kicks Thura into the wrecked terminal, causing his head to hit screws and leaving him unconscious. With the scam exposed, Gowtham is lauded for his efforts and reunites with Anu. Placed under tight police security in a hospital, Thura remains in a vegetative state until an assistant doctor unknowingly injects the wrong medicine into his glucose stream. When the lead doctor scolds the assistant by asking whether he became a doctor using a fake certificate, Thura dies, proving the fatal irony of his fraudulent empire.

== Cast ==
- Atharvaa as Gowtham Ramalingam, a TV journalist
- Catherine Tresa as Anu, Gowtham's colleague and love interest
- Tarun Arora as Thura Sarkar, the fake certificate scam kingpin
- Aadukalam Naren as Ramalingam, Gowtham's father
- Manobala as Madhan, Anu's father and head of the TV channel where Gowtham works
- Karunakaran as Lawyer Balaji, Gowtham's friend
- Sunder Ramu as Senthil, Gowtham's colleague
- K. Bhagyaraj as Gowtham's neighbor
- Ashwin Raja as Thirupathi, peon
- Anil Murali as Inspector Jerald
- Y. G. Mahendra as COE Chandrasekaran
- R. S. Shivaji as Lawyer
- Sai Dheena as Bhai
- Nanjil Vijayan as Salim
- Aadhira Pandilakshmi as Gowtham's mother
- Mathew Varghese as a BBC journalist

== Production ==
The project materialised in October 2013, with producer S Thanu revealing that Atharvaa and Catherine Tresa were signed on by his production house to feature in a film directed by T.N. Santhosh, an erstwhile assistant of A.R. Murugadoss. The film will have music by Sivamani of Arima Nambi fame and camera work by ace cinematographer, Arvind Krishna. The shoot began progressing in December 2013, with a first look poster being revealed the following month. In April 2014, it was reported that Jackie Shroff plays the villain in the film, though he was later replaced by Tarun Arora.

== Soundtrack ==
Kanithan (Original Motion Picture Soundtrack)

Soundtrack album by Drums Sivamani
- Released: 27 January 2016
- Genre: Feature film soundtrack
- Length: 23:11
- Language: Tamil
- Label: Think Music India
- Producer: Drums Sivamani

Drums Sivamani chronology
| Arima Nambi (2014) | Kanithan (Original Motion Picture Soundtrack) (2016) |

Music has been composed by Sivamani. There are a total of five songs in this film.

Track list
| No. | Title | Writer(s) | Singer(s) | Length |
|---|---|---|---|---|
| 1. | "Yappa Chappa" | Madhan Karky | Anirudh Ravichander, Kalpana Raghavendar |
| 2. | "Maiyal Maiyal" | Madhan Karky | Haricharan, Shweta Mohan |
| 3. | "I Viralgal" | Navin | Yazin Nizar, MC AK, Adhrija, Ishaan Dev |
| 4. | "Modern Ponnatha" | Madhan Karky | Karthik, Runa Sivamani, Blaaze |
| 5. | "Che Guevara" | Pulamaipithan | S. P. Balasubrahmanyam |

== Reception ==
Behindwoods wrote, "What could have been an intelligent crackerjack suspense entertainer ends up being a mediocre engaging product due to a few lacklustre moments and some sluggish screenplay in the second half. Despite its flaws, this savvy thriller is worth watching once mainly for some exhilarating action sequences, Atharvaa’s top class performance and a few adrenaline-pumping moments." Hindustan Times wrote "Like so many Tamil films, Kanithan begins with a fantastic idea and story, but Santosh lets these spin out of control -- till the script sinks beyond salvation." Rediff wrote, "Despite the compelling plot, Kanithan is an uninspired action thriller that has little to offer." Times of India wrote "Kanithan feels less than the sum of its parts. The chief reason is the scenes that act as a filler between the action, which are either banal or overlong or both. The film takes a while to get going, and almost the first 30 minutes are wasted through clichéd scenes in the name of setting up the hero's character and his romance." Sify wrote "Overall, Kanithan tries hard to satisfy multiple agendas that telling an interesting story becomes secondary to everything else". Silverscreen wrote, "Kanithan is ambitious in scope and inept in execution." Baradwaj Rangan of The Hindu wrote, ".. we see an increasingly tense cat-and-mouse game between well-matched (and brainy) adversaries. Kanithan is a two-sided procedural...there are some tense moments. The editor (Bhuvan Srinivasan) really goes for the jugular."
