= Space Cowboy (performer) =

Australian entertainer (born 1978)

Chayne Hultgren
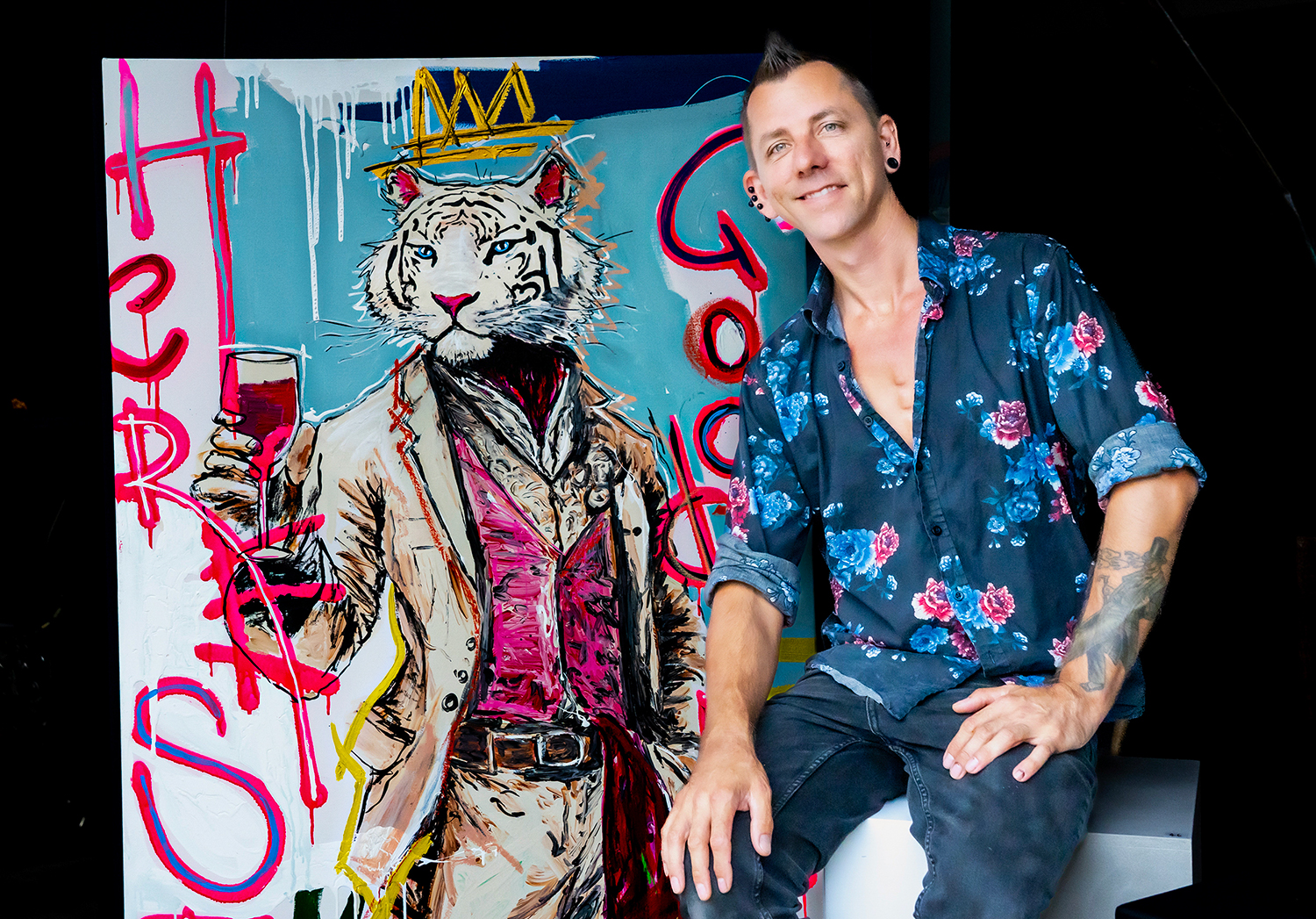
- Hultgren with one of his augmented reality paintings, "Here's to the Good Life".
- Born: Chayne Hultgren; 13 April 1978 (age 48); Byron Bay, New South Wales, Australia
- Other name: The Space Cowboy
- Occupations: Performer and visual artist
- Spouse: Zoe Ellis (m. 2007)
- Children: 1

Chayne Hultgren (born 13 April 1978), known professionally as the Space Cowboy, is an Australian visual artist and performer. He is recognised for his 56x Guinness World Records as an extreme performance artist and sideshow, street, and freak show performer, as well as his work as a contemporary artist incorporating augmented reality (AR) into his pieces.

== Career ==
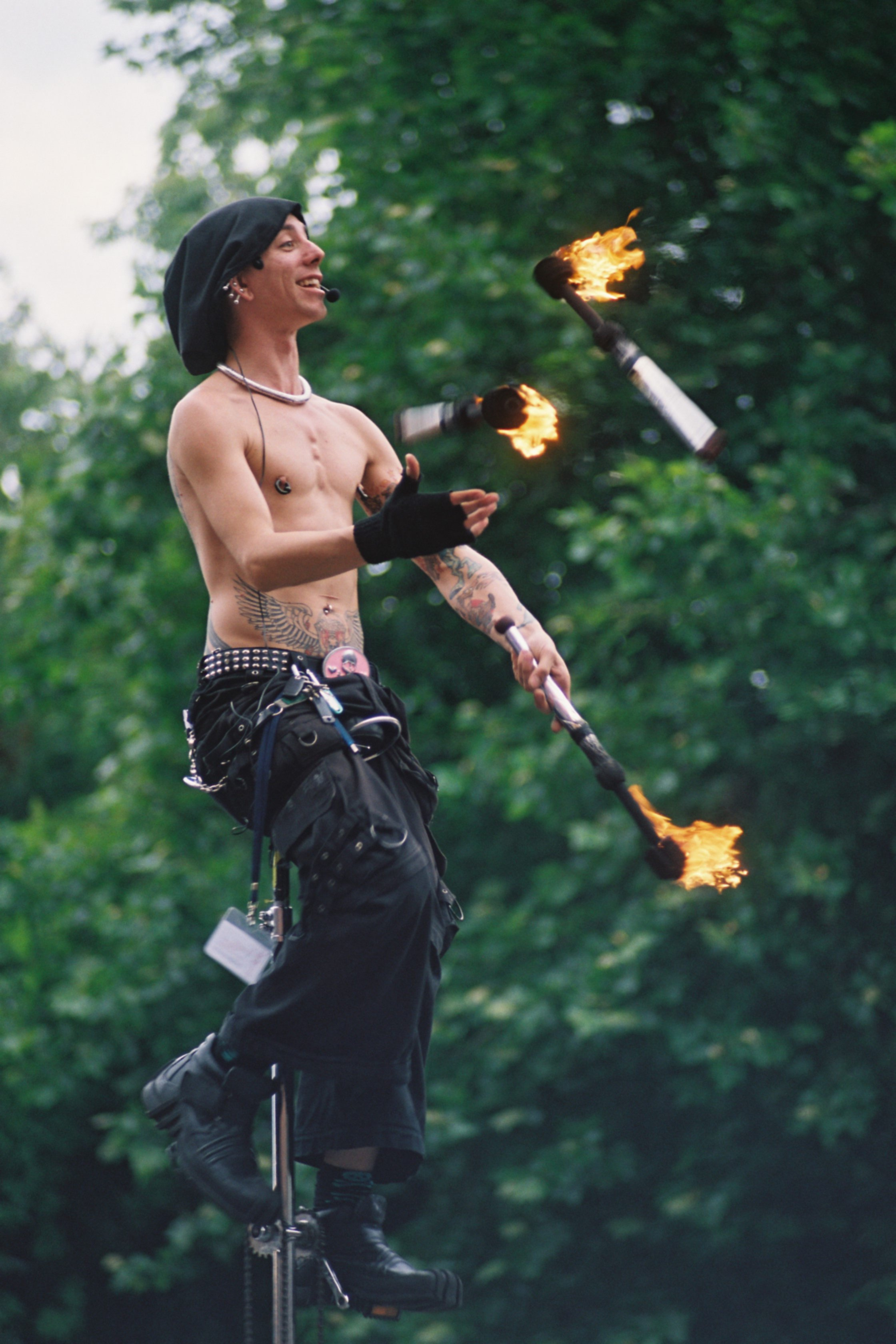
The Space Cowboy performing in Dublin in 2007

=== Performances ===
Hultgren performs a number of acts, including catching flaming arrows blindfolded after they are fired from a bow or crossbow, juggling running chainsaws while riding a 3 m (10 ft) unicycle, and sword swallowing. He has also incorporated elements of mentalism and illusion, such as mind reading, spoon bending, and levitation. Other performances have involved traditional sideshow stunts including the human blockhead and suspension from flesh hooks. In one theatre piece, he swallowed a 60 cm (24 in) illuminated 2,000-volt neon tube fitted with a microphone, allowing his heartbeat to be amplified while the light glowed through his torso.

He has also toured his "Mutant Barnyard". His traveling tent show displays his collection of historical freak show items, including rare and unusual oddities. These include his earliest item, Ditto, the double-bodied duckling, a two-headed cow named Daisy and Maisy, an albino kangaroo, extreme body modification skulls from Peru, shrunken heads from Ecuador and 18th-century paintings of bearded women and a young child with lobster hands. He regards this as a traveling "Museum of Mutations and Oddities". One of his latest acquisitions is what is claimed to be the genuine preserved head of Horace Ridler, a professional tattooed freak and sideshow performer better known as The Great Omi or The Zebra Man, who died in 1969.

Hultgren has performed his shows in a variety of locations, including streets, theaters, the Sydney Opera House, the Sydney Royal Easter Show, the Edinburgh Festival Fringe, Glastonbury Festival, the Adelaide Festival of Arts, the Gentse Feesten (Ghent Festival in Belgium), the Rotterdam Straatfestival, the Toronto BuskerFest, the Woodford Folk Festival and the Edmonton International Street Performers Festival, Movie World.

In August 2011, he was arrested while performing on the streets in New York City for "brandishing a sword in public". He was later released without charge after having his props confiscated.

=== Contemporary art ===
Since 2021, Hultgren has worked as a contemporary artist, painting canvases often featuring anthropomorphic subjects. Many of his works include AR elements that are brought to life through the use of a smartphone. The opening of his first exhibition in his own Byron Bay gallery included a live performance from Hultgren, combining painting and a live Tesla coil.

== Achievements ==
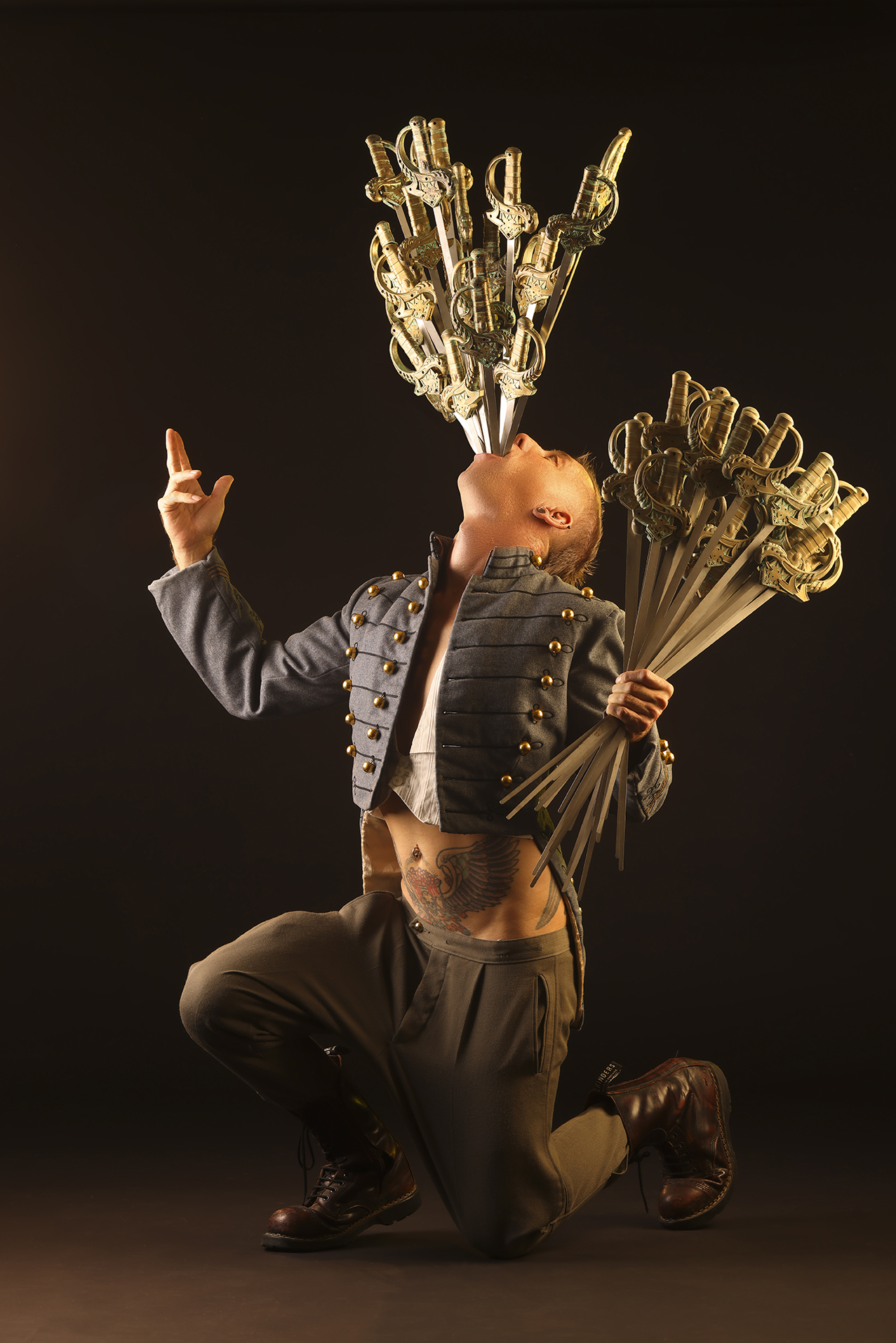
Hultgren swallowing 29 swords – his personal record

Hultgren is 'Australia's most prolific record breaker' and as of August 2025 he holds 56 official Guinness World Records.

His first record broken was most swords swallowed (17 at once), then broke that record again, this time scoring 27 swords at the Irish Street Performance Festival (although this 27 swords record is unofficial) and on 8 February 2010 the BBC recorded that he broke this official world record by swallowing 18 swords. Due to an internal deformation medically known as congenital division of the stomach, the lower half of his stomach has been replicated and sits lower than the average human stomach, allowing him to swallow longer swords. He can swallow the entire length of a 72 cm sword blade.

Hultgren holds many "world firsts" such as first double sword swallow, first sword swallow underwater, and his signature trick "the Black and Decker Digestion Wrecker", a power drill with sword attachment which he swallows. He is the first person to publicly swallow a sword underwater in a tank of live sharks. He was reported to have been the youngest working sword-swallower in Australia, when he was 22 years old.

== Television appearances ==
In 2009 Hultgren appeared on the Australian television show Australia's Got Talent. His other TV appearances include Ripley's Believe It or Not! (USA), Don't Try This at Home (UK), The Sideshow (Australia), "Guinness O Mundo dos Recordes" (Spain) and "Lo show dei record" (Italian version of the Guinness World Records show). He later appeared in the US TV show The World's Best, but was eliminated in the first round. However, due to a shortage, he was brought back as a wild card, and once again was eliminated in the battle round.
