= Shiv Hare =

Indian filmmaker

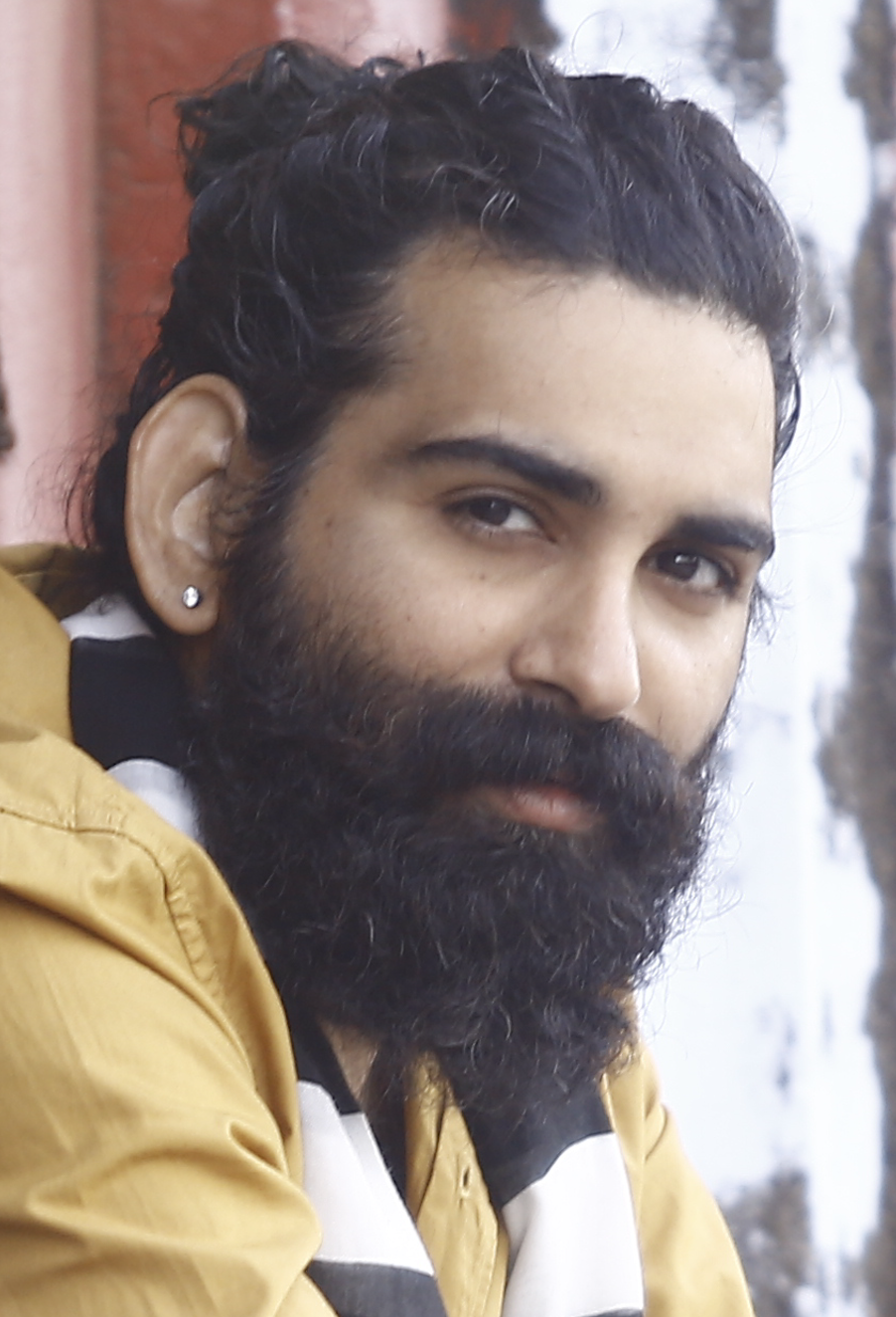
- Born: S Shiv; Jhansi, India
- Occupations: Director, Writer, Producer and Lyricist
- Years active: 1999 – present
- Notable work: Atkan Chatkan (2020)
- Website: iamshivhare.com

S Shiv (also known as Shiv Hare) is an Indian filmmaker, writer, producer and lyricist. He made his directorial debut in 2020 with Hindi movie Atkan Chatkan for which he got the 'Best Director' awards at the South London Film Festival & Jaipur International Film Festival.

== Early life ==
Born in Jhansi, Uttar Pradesh, he did his studies from Jhansi, Gwalior, Delhi & Mandi. His passion for theatre and performing arts had cradled his love and interest in music and direction at a very early stage. He completed his formal training in Dramatic Arts from the Himachal Culture Research Forum And Theater Repertory (attached to the National School of Drama, Delhi). During his stint at the drama school, he performed extensively with the likes of Late Shri BV Karanth and Shri Habib Tanvir.

== Career ==
After exploring various projects post his diploma in 2001 from the drama school and started his own theater company called The Soul Art Theater Academy in Jhansi, his theater endeavors met successful collaborations with eminent theater personalities like Alok Chatterji, Devendra Raj Ankur and Suresh Sharma on various projects. After running his company for three years, but yearning for more, he moved to Mumbai in 2002 and nosedived straight into the television industry. He shuffled through various job profiles ranging from that of an Assistant Director (in Ssshhhh...Koi Hai, Vikraal Aur Gabraal and Sanjivani for Star Plus, Aati Rahengi Baharein for Zee TV, Saaksshi for Sony TV), to an Executive Producer (on shows like Jassi Jaissi Koi Nahin aired on Sony Entertainment Television).

His first feature film project was as an Assistant Director in Sssshhh... (by Mr. Pavan S Kaul) in 2003. Eventually he joined Advertisement Film-making with Code Red Productions in 2004 and remained there till 2006. He was an associate in the direction department and did many prominent ad films there; such as We the People (National Anthem), Parle Monaco, McDonald's, Cadbury's, Titan, LG, Savlon, Kaun Banega Crorepati, Airtel, Mentos, Videocon, Tide, Pepsi, Idea, Heinz and many more.

Since 2006, he has been working as an independent filmmaker and casting director, and has cast for over 100 production houses/ad agencies and thousands of TV commercials. Some of the prominent and regular ad film production houses and ad agencies he has worked with being: Nirvana Films, Black Magic Films, Ramesh Deo Productions, Sanjay Leela Bhansali Productions, Yash Raj Films, Satyaloka Films, Rajiv Menon Films, Ravi Jadhav Films, White Light Films, Highlight Films, Opticus Films, Chrome pictures, Purple Vishnu Films, Redmint, O&M, Rediffusion, J Walter Thompson, Saatchi & Saatchi, Lowe Lintas, McCann Worldgroup, Leo Burnett, etc. Other than these, he has produced an untitled Hindi feature which is currently under post-production and directed another one which is to release soon. Recently, he wrote and directed Atkan Chatkan which was presented by A.R. Rahman and the legendary Amitabh Bachchan has also given playback in it. The film has been widely appreciated by platforms such as WION, GQ India, News 18, etc.

== Filmography ==
=== Feature films ===
Year	Film	Language	Role
2020	Atkan Chatkan	Hindi	Director & writer (as S Shiv)
2025	Pintu Ki Pappi	Hindi	Director, Writer, Lyricist & Actor

=== Television ===
Year	Film	Language	Channel	Role
2018	Naamkarann	Hindi	Star Plus	Series Director (as S Shiv)

=== Special appearances ===
Year	Name	Format	Role
2007	McDonald's	TV Commercial	Guest
2009	Maruti Mera Dosst	Feature Film	Guest
2021	Aghor	Music Video	Singer
2021	Black Bud	Feature Film	Guest

== Awards and nominations ==
Year	Award	Category	Work	Result
2021	South London Film Festival	Best Director	Atkan Chatkan	Won
2021	Jaipur International Film Festival	Best Director	Atkan Chatkan	Won

== See also ==
- List of Indian Film Directors
