= Brad Byers =

American entertainer

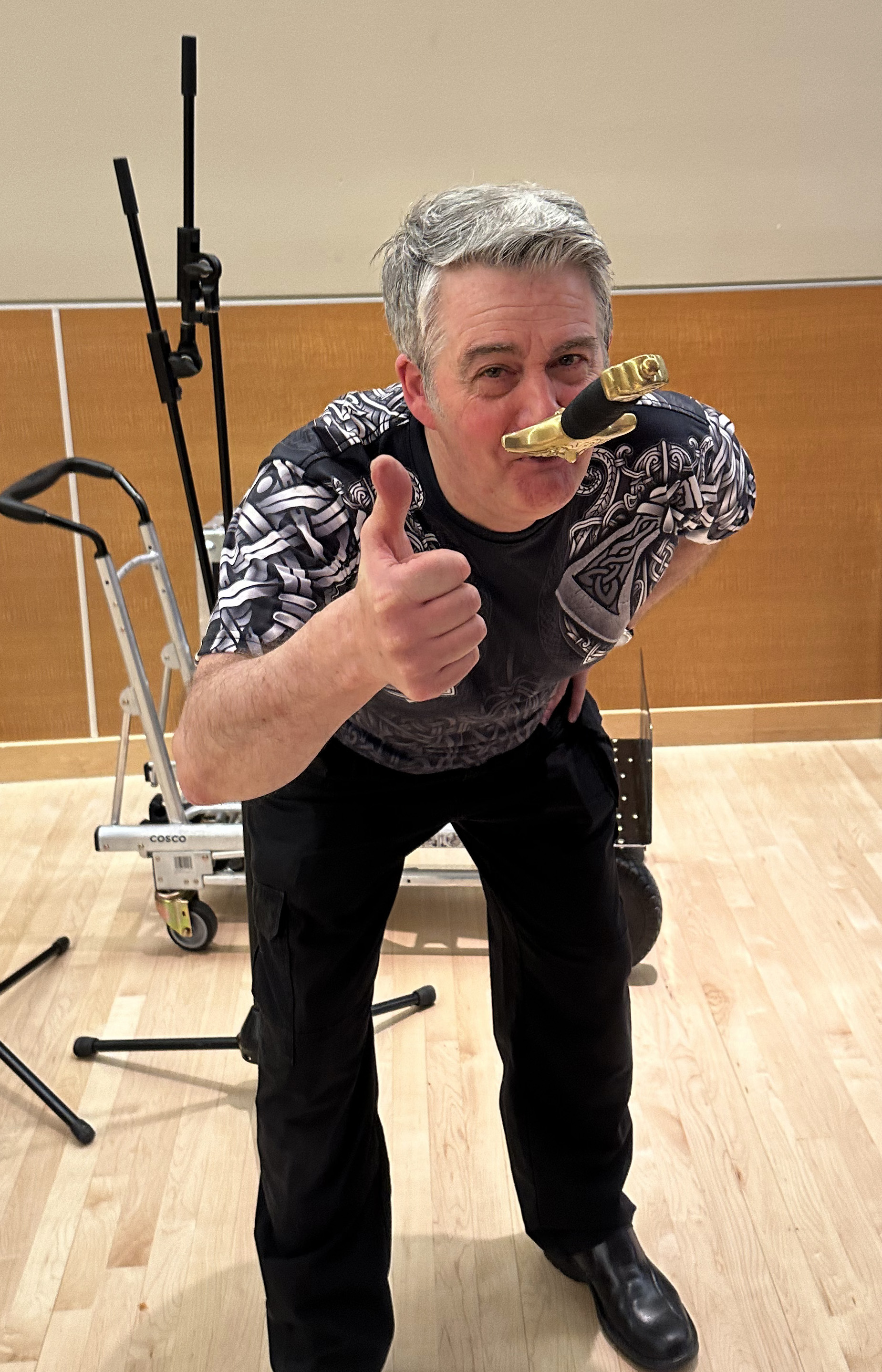
- Byers sword swallowing in April 2024
- Born: October 8, 1959 (age 66); Moscow, Idaho, United States
- Occupations: Stunt performer; sideshow performer
- Years active: 1975–present
- Website: bradbyers.com

Brad Byers (born October 8, 1959) is an American entertainer known for his extreme performances, including sword swallowing, lying on beds of nails and inserting various tools into his nasal cavity. For the latter he is also referred to as a "Human toolbox". He holds several World Records. His brother Rod assists him in some performances.

== Biography ==
Brad Byers was born and raised in Moscow, Idaho. According to the biography given on his official site, he joined a traveling circus to become a juggler shortly after graduating from high school. Two years later he left the circus to focus on TV performances. He began swallowing swords at the age of 21. Throughout his career he performed in more than 20 countries. He is listed in the 1999, 2000 and 2003 editions of the Guinness Book of Records. He also took part in fourth, eighth, and twenty-first seasons of NBC's America's Got Talent (2009, 2013, 2026).

== Performances ==
=== Sword swallowing ===
He earned a Guinness World Record for "The Most Swords Swallowed and Twisted at One Time" by swallowing twelve 27-inch swords one at a time until all 12 were in his esophagus and then twisting all 12 swords 180 degrees in his throat before withdrawing them and taking a bow. He is also among the few people in the world able to swallow a curved sword.

=== "Human toolbox" ===
"Human toolbox" is a moniker given to him by the Guinness World Records for his activities involving inserting various tools in his nasal cavity. He hammers in a nail or an awl and hangs a weight on it. Seen through the X-ray, the nail stops in several millimeters from his brain. He puts in a fishing hook into his nasal cavity so that it shows up out of his mouth. He also puts in a drill when it is being turned on. As it reaches maximum safe depth, he turns the drill off and on again when getting it out.

=== Other ===
He has also laid on a bed of nails while his brother ran over him driving a quad bike.
