= Aerial Manx =

Australian sideshow entertainer based in Amsterdam

- Born: Melbourne, Australia
- Occupation: Performance Artist
- Website: www.aerialmanx.com

Aerial Manx. is an Amsterdam-based Australian sideshow entertainer who works in the field of acrobatic sword swallowing.

== Early life ==
Aerial Manx was born in Melbourne, Australia. He began training in martial arts at age four. At age 15, Manx was introduced to circus through the Circus Oz youth program. By age 17, Manx had achieved a first Dan black belt in Jiu-Jitsu and was regularly traveling to Melbourne from South-East Victoria to attend Australia's first self-run Youth Circus, Trick Circus.

== Career ==
Manx enrolled at the National Institute of Circus Arts (NICA) at age 19, and completed his training at the school with his graduating performance during the 2007 NICA production of DiVino. While studying at NICA, Manx focused on sideshow and mind-over-matter stunts as well as being trained in aerial dance under Holly Rollins, an ex-Cirque du Soleil performer. After leaving NICA in 2007, Manx began his professional performing career performing fire eating in various nightclubs throughout Melbourne. During this initial stage, Manx also began performing street theatre on the streets of Melbourne CBD. Manx's busking show started out with basic skills, gradually building up to a duo show with The Great Gordo Gamsby, and has since built up to be a highly energetic solo circle busking show that showcases his skills in contortion, contact juggling, acrobatics and his signature stunts in the field of sword swallowing acrobats. Manx has performed his busking show throughout the UK, Europe, South East Asia and the much of Australia.

At the 2007/8 Woodford Folk Music Festival, Manx performed a stunt with a double neon-tube swallow, swallowing two separate 2,000v simultaneously. Earlier in his career, Aerial was a member of the Kaos Kreepshow as well as the Opposable Thumbs Sideshow, and now performs group shows predominantly with The League of Sideshow Superstars and Solid State Circus Manx continues to practice in contact juggling, juggling, acrobatics, contortion, fire eating, glass walking, blockhead, suspension/suspension dance and various other forms of prop manipulation.

Some highlights of Manx's career have been performing at the Glastonbury Festival in 2014, winning the People's Choice Award at the 2014 Auckland International Busking Festival, and performing his solo theatre shows "False Messiah" and "Not Dead Yet" at the Melbourne, Adelaide and Perth Fringe Festivals.

== Records ==
=== Sword Swallowers Association International Records ===
Manx has 12 world records listed with the Sword Swallowers Association International which are:

1. First person to swallow two neon tubes simultaneously - 2007/8
2. First person to perform a handstand whilst swallowing a sword - 3 August 2008
3. Longest time swallowing a sword whilst performing a handstand (17 seconds) - 2010
4. World First Aerial Walkover whilst swallowing a sword - 2010
5. World First suicide drop on Chinese pole whilst swallowing a sword - August 2010
6. World First Sword Swallow while Balancing Upside Down in a Hand-to-hand Handstand (Based by Hemlock Mejarne) - 2010
7. Most cartwheels whilst swallowing a sword (9 cartwheels) - February 2011
8. World First chainsaw/machete juggle whilst swallowing a sword - 29 March 2011
9. World First backflip whilst swallowing a sword - 29 March 2011
10. First person to swallow two neon tubes and a sword simultaneously - 3 May 2011
11. Heaviest Weighted Sword Swallow (31kg) - 3 May 2011
12. World First sword swallow flesh hook suspension performance (including pyrotechnics) - 29 May 2011

==== Guinness World Records ====
Manx has three Guinness World Records. His first was awarded to him on Lo Show Dei Record in Milan, Italy on 3 July 2014 and the second and third were awarded to him at the Venetian Casino in Macau on 10 January 2015.

1. Guinness World Record for Most Backflips While Sword Swallowing in One Minute - 3 July 2014
2. Guinness World Record for the Heaviest Weight to be Dangled From a Swallowed Sword - 10 January 2015
3. Guinness World Record for the Fastest Human Backbend Walk over 20 metres - 10 January 2015

== Public life ==
In 2011, Manx made headlines in Victorian newspapers for a confrontation between Melbourne City Council officers and himself for performing without a permit. The confrontation resulted in a $1,500 fine. In 2012, Manx was asked to be the subject of the Anatomy Arts documentary series for Matchbox Pictures, which was shot by Carnival Cinema, in the episode titled "Stomach".

== Personal life ==
Manx lives in Melbourne, Australia.
