= Pintu Ki Pappi =

2025 Indian film

- Theatrical release poster
- Directed by: Shiv Hare
- Written by: Shiv Hare; Anadi Sufi
- Produced by: Vidhi Acharya
- Starring: Shushant; Jaanyaa Joshi; Viidhi; Vijay Raaz; Murli Sharma; Aditi Sanwal; Ganesh Acharya
- Cinematography: Ajay Pandey
- Edited by: Manoj Magarr
- Music by: Nitz 'N' Sony
- Production companies: V2S Productions and Entertainment
- Distributed by: Mythri Movie Makers
- Release date: 21 March 2025
- Running time: 135 minutes
- Country: India
- Language: Hindi

Pintu Ki Pappi is a 2025 Indian Hindi-language romantic comedy film directed by Shiv Hare. It stars Shushant, Jaanyaa Joshi, and Viidhi, alongside Vijay Raaz, Murli Sharma, Aditi Sanwal, and Ganesh Acharya in supporting roles. The film is produced by Vidhi Acharya, wife of Choreographer Ganesh Acharya. Pintu Ki Pappi was released on 21 March 2025.

== Plot ==
Pintu is a troublemaker. His life changes suddenly when he meets a young woman. What happens next is a journey filled with love, confusion and surprising events. It changes his world in ways he never thought possible.

== Cast ==
- Shushant
- Jaanyaa Joshi
- Viidhi
- Vijay Raaz
- Murli Sharma
- Aditi Sanwal
- Ganesh Acharya
- Puja Banerjee
- Ali Asgar
- Sunil Pal

The soundtrack for the 2025 film Pintu Ki Pappi features 10 tracks composed by artists like Dr. Nitz and Shafaat Ali,Prasad S with lyrics by Raman Raghuvanshi and others. You can explore the complete track listing and official details on platforms like Apple Music and MySwar.

== Release ==
Pintu Ki Pappi was released on 21 March 2025.

== Reception ==
Ganesh Aaglave of Firstpost rated the film three out of five stars and wrote, "With its entertaining storyline, fresh performances, and engaging music, Pintu Ki Pappi is a complete family entertainer." Dhaval Roy of The Times of India gave it two out of five stars and wrote, "Pintu Ki Pappi has a quirky premise and a few genuinely amusing moments, but it struggles under the weight of its chaotic storytelling and over-the-top characters." Rishabh Suri of Hindustan Times gave it one-and-a-half out of five stars and wrote, "Forced humour and bad acting do this film no favours, which has few redeeming qualities."
