= Matt the Knife =

American magician and mentalist (born 1988)

- Matt the Knife on stage reading an audience member's mind, 2015
- Born: Matthew Cassiere; 1988 (age 37–38); Rhode Island, U.S.
- Occupations: Mentalist, magician, speaker, comedian, escapologist
- Website: matttheknife.com

Matt the Knife (also called MTK; born 1988) is a magician and mentalist.

He has broken a number of Guinness World Records.

== Career ==
Matt the Knife has performed in twenty-one countries across four continents (including television shows in the United States, China, Italy, Canada, the United Kingdom and several others).

He is probably best known for his feats of mentalism, but also often mixes sword swallowing, stunts, escapes, magic and his unique brand of humor in to his stage performances.

As of 2021, he had broken twelve Guinness records. They include records for things such as escapes, sword swallowing, fire manipulation, feats of strength, and card manipulation. He usually performs these stunts for publicity or as the climax of his television specials.

He also founded a consulting firm that specializes in the prevention of fraud and cheating within the gaming industry. He also works with corporations, security & police forces, as well as the film, literary, theatrical and television industries to create realistic characters and help develop more accurate depictions of topics involving criminal activity, the occult, the allied arts, the magical arts and mentalism.

A séance-based performance, entitled Epitaph, debuted in Rhode Island and toured in several major cities including Philadelphia, Boston, Washington, D.C., and New Orleans. It was eventually renamed Possessions and was adapted into a large-scale stage version in 2017. Despite his claims that it was only intended for entertainment, it has occasionally come under criticism by some religious groups in the U.S.

Matt the Knife has been featured in the New York Post, The New York Times, ESPN Magazine, the Philadelphia City Paper, PLAY Magazine, the METRO newspaper, Road King Magazine, Escape Masters Magazine, Amusement Business Magazine, and The Wall Street Journal; as well as being on the Discovery Channel, NBC, Ripley's Believe It or Not!, CNN, The History channel, National Geographic Channel, Adult Swim on The Cartoon Network, Guinness World Records, Sirius Satellite Radio, CCTV (China), Rai Tre (Italy) and the BBC (United Kingdom).
