= Sword swallowing =

Performance skill

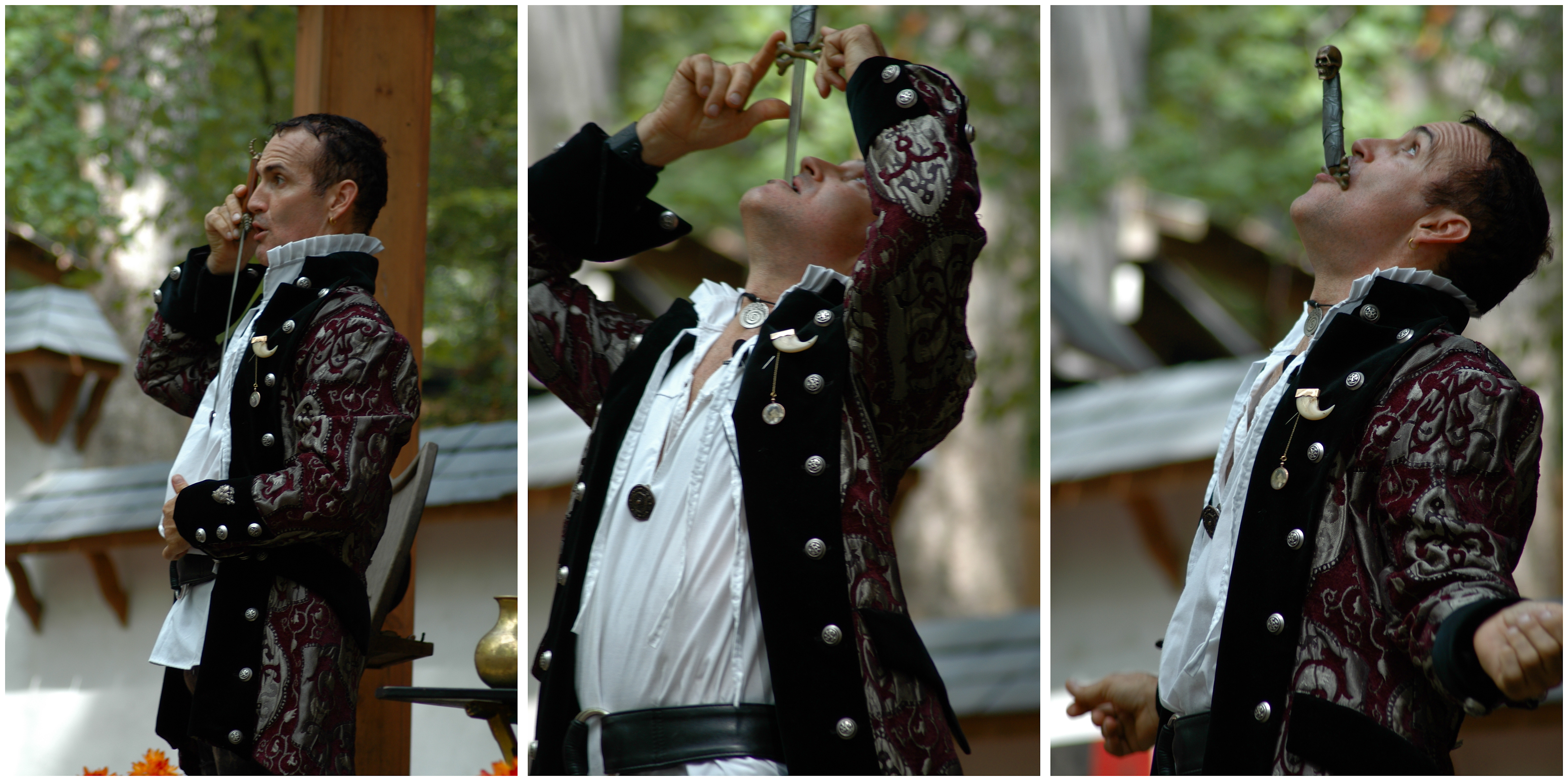
Johnny Fox sword swallowing at Maryland Renaissance Festival.

Sword swallowing is a skill in which the performer passes a sword through the mouth and down the esophagus to the stomach. This feat is not swallowing in the traditional sense. The natural processes that constitute swallowing do not take place, but are repressed to keep the passage from the mouth to the stomach open for the sword. The practice is dangerous and there is risk of serious injury or death.

== History ==
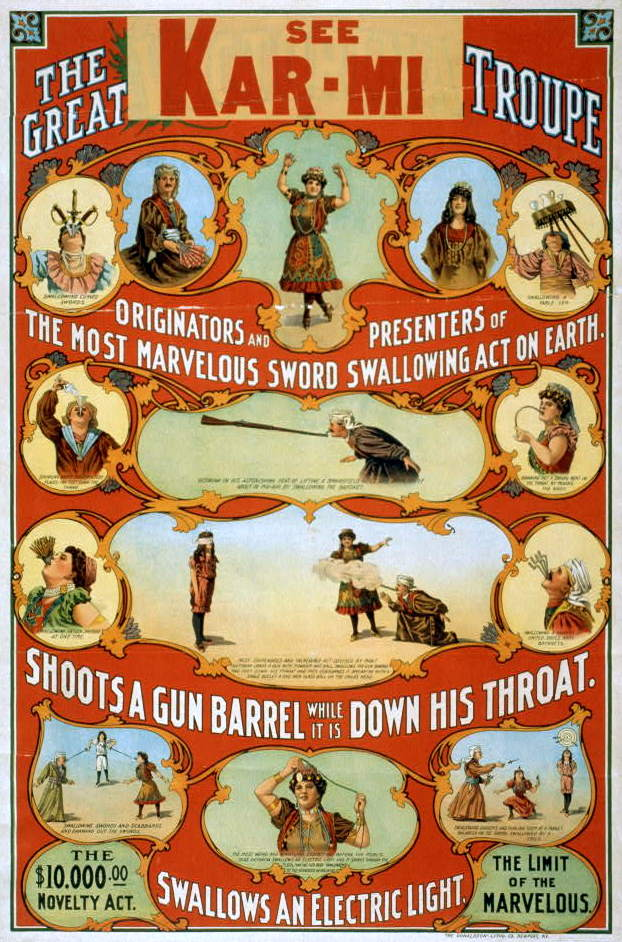
"The Great Victorina Troupe: originators and presenters of the most marvelous sword swallowing act on earth"

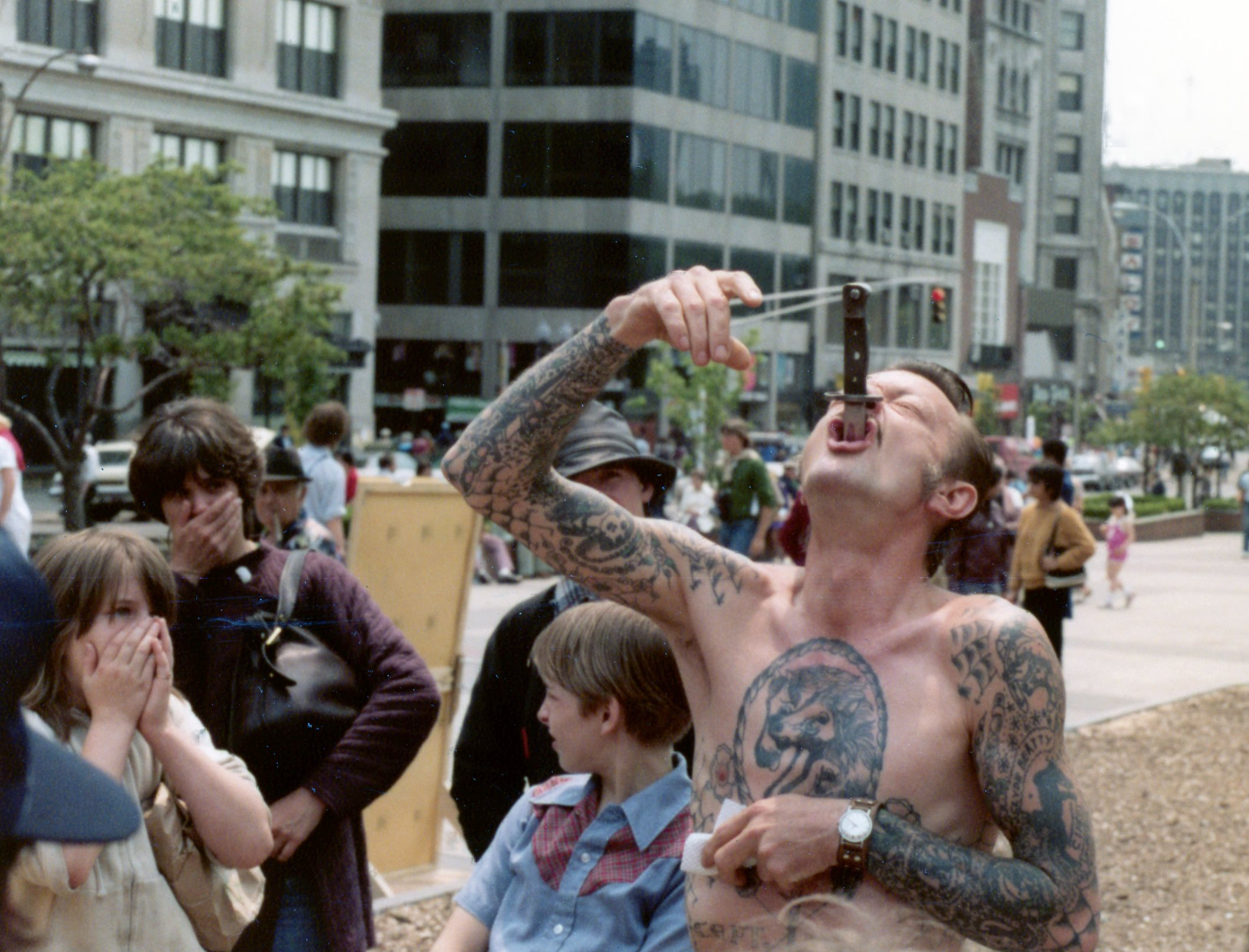
Sword swallowing by street performer

Sword swallowing spread to Greece and Rome in the 1st century AD and to China in the 8th century. In Japan, it became a part of the Japanese acrobatic theatre, Sangaku, which included fire eating, tightrope walking, juggling and early illusion. In Europe, it developed into yet a third distinct type of performance associated with the medieval jongleurs, that of the street performance.

Sword swallowing was performed during the Middle Ages as part of street theatre and was popular at festivals and other large gatherings. It began to die out in the mid-19th century and was outlawed in Scandinavia in 1893. Prolific swallower Teodor Olsen famously made an appeal to Haakon VII of Norway, who was not swayed by his performance enough to rescind the ban.

According to an early-19th-century English magazine article the abilities of sword-swallowers in India were considered incredible when first reported in England. In 1813 'swallowing the sword' was advertised as among the new and astonishing feats performed by the Indian Jugglers then appearing in London. The troupe was led by the famous juggler and sword swallower Ramo Samee, who continued to perform until his death in London in August 1850, having at times also toured Europe and America. From 1850 to the 1890s a small number of sword swallowers performed in the UK, such as Martha Mitchell (c. 1855) and Benedetti (1863–1895), and in the US, including Lawson Peck (c. 1850s), Ling Look (c. 1872), Wandana (d. 1875), and Harry Parsons (d. 1880). The best-known North American sword swallower of this time was Fred McLone, better known to the public as "Chevalier Cliquot", who performed from 1878 to the early 20th century.

In 1893, sword swallowing was featured at the World Columbian Exposition at the Chicago World's Fair.

In the early 1900s, traveling circuses and sideshows featured sword swallowers. In Europe performers tried to swallow large numbers of swords; in America there was a focus on the novel and bizarre. Some tried to swallow longer swords, many swords, hot swords, bayonets or glowing neon tubes. Sword swallowers appeared on the same bill as magicians, such as Houdini. Western Europe and England also saw an increase in sword swallowing interest during this period, with many cross-Atlantic influences. During the late 19th century and early 20th century, traveling magic shows from the Orient toured Europe and America; some included sword swallowing. The middle of the 20th century saw a demise in circuses in general and sideshows in particular.

== Anatomy and method ==
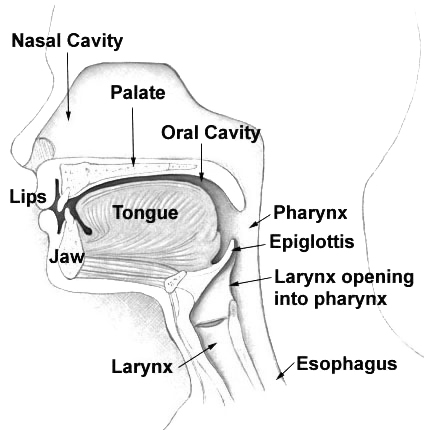
Cross section of the head and inner neck, including the pharynx

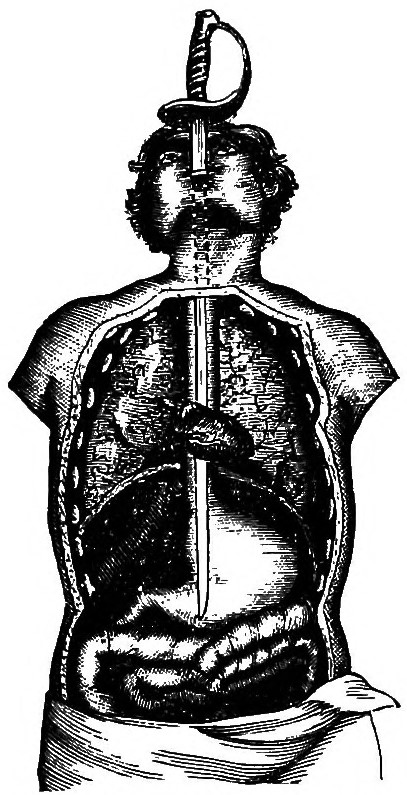
Position of swallowed sword within swallower

The performer must first lean the head back, hyper-extending the neck, and relax the upper esophageal sphincter (a generally involuntary muscle that contracts the top of the esophagus). Retching must be controlled while the sword, lubricated by saliva, is inserted through the mouth and past the pharynx.

According to a study on eight "normal subjects", the transverse diameter of the pharynx at its smallest point is on average 1.7 ± 0.5 cm (0.67 ± 0.20 in).

Once past the pharynx and esophageal sphincter, the sword passes swiftly, assisted by gravity, straightening the flexible esophagus. The stomach, at an angle to the esophagus, is brought into line as the sword enters through the cardiac opening. Some swallowers consume a large meal or drink water before performing to give the stomach a more vertical orientation, allowing for easier passage of the sword. Careful focus is required to complete the process without injury, as the sword passes within millimetres of vital body parts such as the aorta, heart and lungs.

== Physical consequences ==
Most serious sword swallowing injuries and fatalities occur after minor injuries or while attempting a feat beyond that of a normal sword swallow. The most common injury is a sore throat when first learning, after frequent consecutive performances, or after swallowing curved swords or several swords at once. Swallowing multiple swords simultaneously over time can also lead to distension of the esophagus. A minor injury may predispose the performer to sustaining a more major one, including perforation of the esophagus, stomach, heart, lungs, and other organs in proximity to the path of the sword, or intestinal bleeding. Twenty-nine deaths have been reported as a result of sword swallowing injuries since 1880.

=== Medical case reports ===
- A 59-year-old man experienced chest pain and severe dysphagia following practice for his sword swallowing act. An esophageal perforation was found and surgically repaired; 19 days later a leak at the site required a transhiatal esophagectomy with a left cervical esophagogastrostomy. The patient recovered normally, but ceased the practice of sword swallowing.
- A 27-year-old woman reported neck pain and a single episode of hematemesis (vomiting blood) after pricking her throat while practicing her sword swallowing act with a sharp dagger. The injury was found to be immediately below the esophageal sphincter, and the patient was admitted to intensive care and placed on intravenous antibiotics and a proton-pump inhibitor. She recovered well and returned to all previous activities with the exception of sword swallowing.

== Contributions to medicine ==
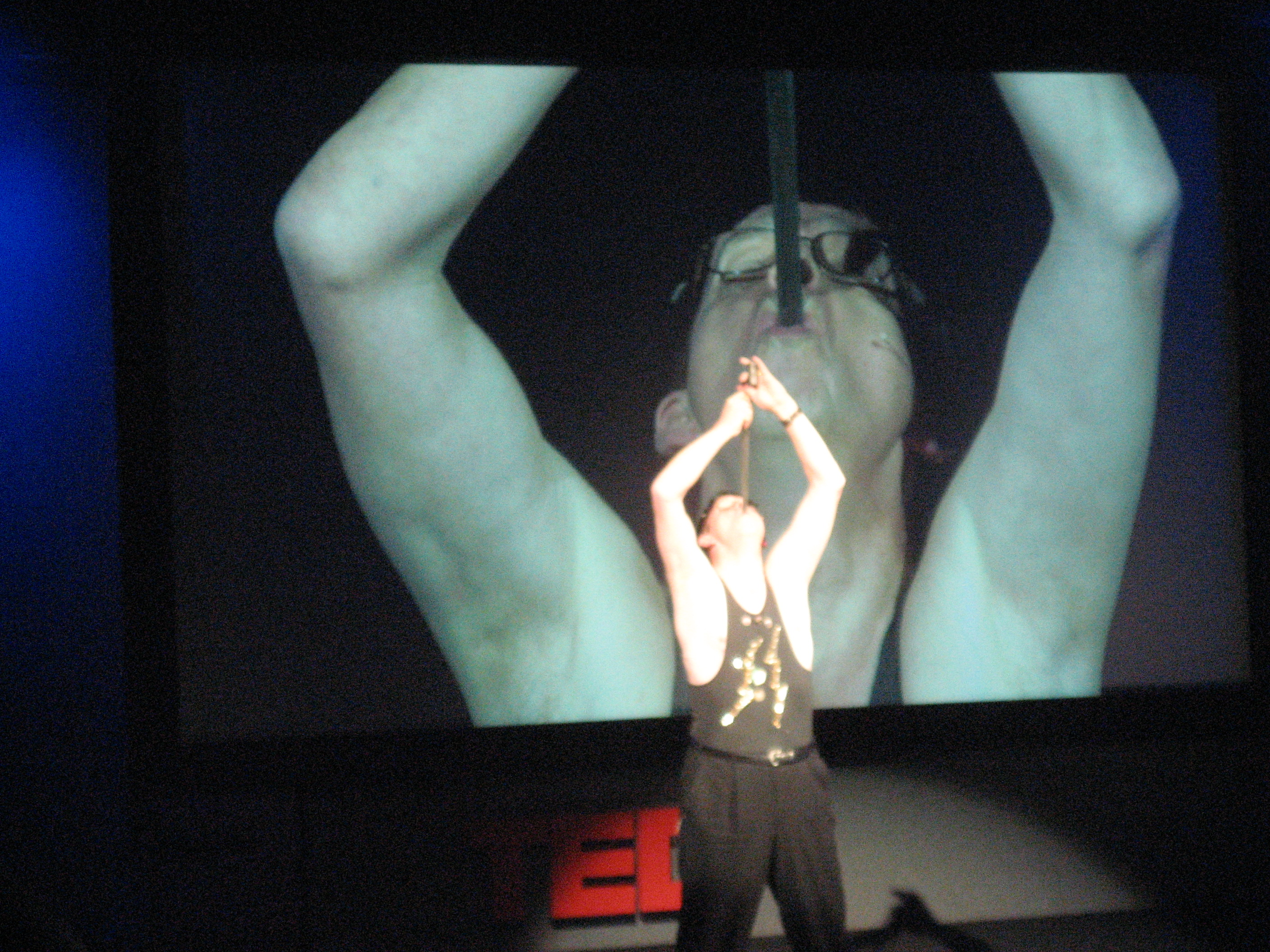
Hans Rosling of Gapminder Foundation swallows a bayonet during his TED talk

The abilities of sword-swallowers have proven useful to the progress of medical knowledge, specifically in the development and advancement of upper endoscopy.

In 1868, Adolf Kussmaul of Freiburg, Germany, performed an esophagoscopy on a sword-swallower using a rigid 47 cm (19 in) tube, mirrors, and a gasoline lamp. The apparatus, an early endoscope, allowed him to examine the esophagus and the fundus of the stomach.

In 1897, a Scottish physician named Stevens performed digestive experiments with a sword swallower assistant. Small metal tubes, pierced with holes and filled with meat, were swallowed and after a time regurgitated, allowing Stevens to examine the extent of the digestion that had taken place.

In 1906, a doctor named Cremer performed an electrocardiogram by passing an electrode down the esophagus of a sword swallower. This approach has since been proven useful by numerous studies; esophageal recording at a location in proximity to the heart improves signal detection.

From 2003 to 2006, a research study on the effects of sword swallowing was conducted by Dan Meyer of the Sword Swallowers Association International and Dr. Brian Witcombe, consultant radiologist at the Gloucestershire Royal Hospital in Gloucester, England. The results of their research were published in "Sword swallowing and its side effects" in the December 23, 2006 issue of the British Medical Journal. The paper won the team the 2007 Ig Nobel Prize in Medicine at Harvard.

In January 2006, Dan Meyer worked with physicians and researchers in swallowing disorders at Vanderbilt Stallworth Rehabilitation Center at Vanderbilt University Medical Center in Nashville, Tennessee to explore whether the techniques involved in sword swallowing could be used to help patients who suffer from swallowing disorders such as dysphagia or achalasia.

In 2007, Dai Andrews worked with Dr. Sharon Caplan at Johns Hopkins University on a study to determine whether sword swallowing could be used to help patients who suffer from achalasia, or those who had suffered severe throat trauma.

== Known sword swallowers ==
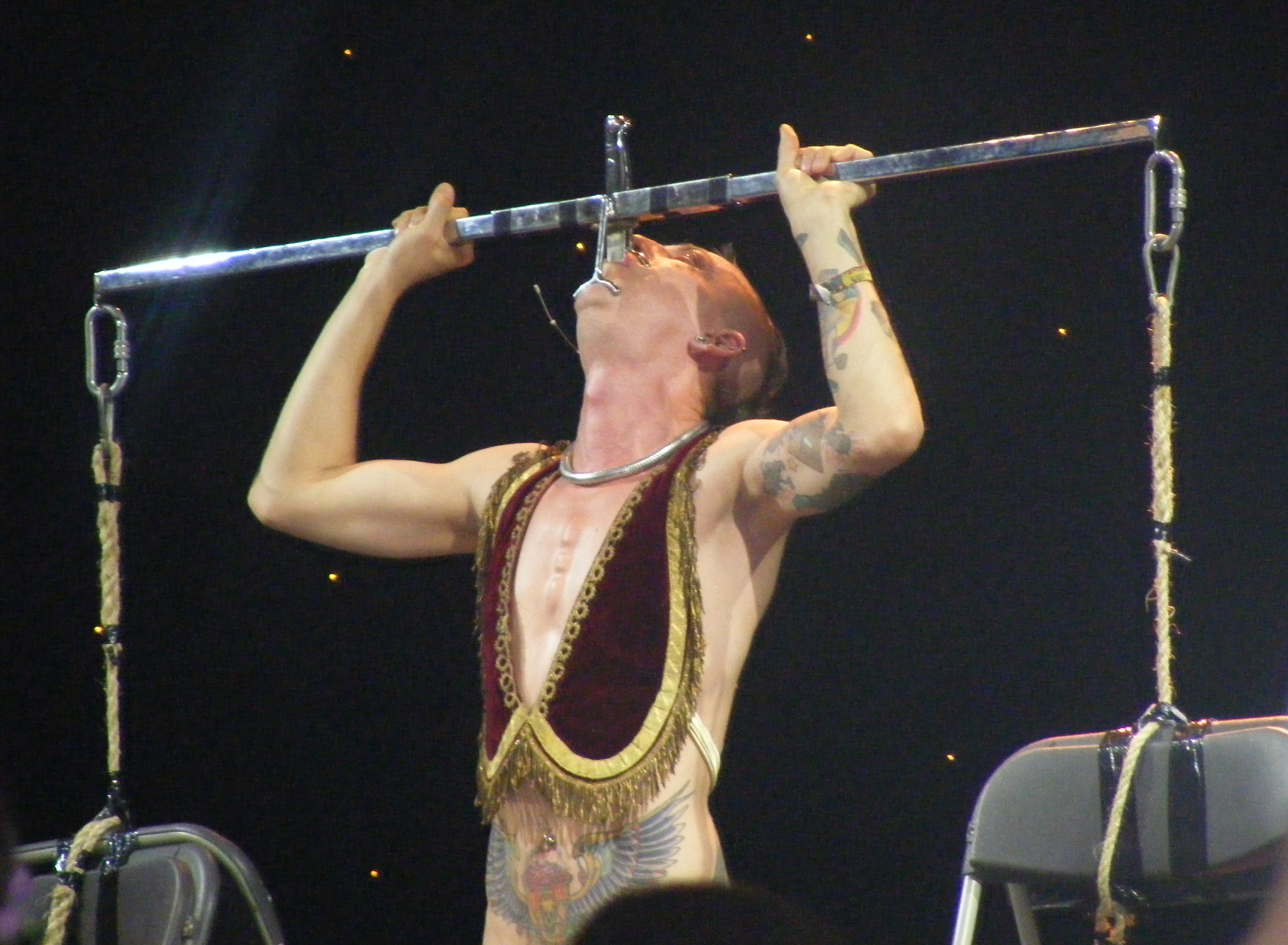
Space Cowboy swallowing a sword attached to a metal bar from which weights are suspended

Modern sword swallowers include:

- Aerial Manx
- Brad Byers
- Brett Loudermilk - Cirque du Soleil performer who appeared on Season 15 of America's Got Talent
- Chayne Hultgren - The Space Cowboy
- Dai Andrews
- David Blaine
- Erik Sprague - The Lizardman
- George McArthur - known professionally as "George the Giant (the world's tallest sword swallower)", who played Colossus in the film Big Fish
- Gregory Paul Mclaren - Lucky Diamond Rich
- Johnny Strange
- Josh Routh
- Matt the Knife
- Ryan Stock

== Guinness World Records ==
In 2009, the Guinness World Record for Longest Sword Swallowed was achieved by Natasha Veruschka with a 58 cm (23 in) sword.

The Guinness World Record for Most Swords Swallowed Underwater is five and was achieved at Ripley's Aquarium of the Smokies on February 13, 2016 by Chris Steele. He was also the first person to swallow a sword underwater on May 9, 2006 at Manly Ocean World Aquarium in Sydney Australia. He performed this underwater feat in a tank of live sharks.

Chayne Hultgren (a.k.a. The Space Cowboy) also holds the most official Guinness World Records for sword swallowing including Most Swords Swallowed at Once (24 swords), Most Swords Swallowed While Juggling (18 swords), Most Swords Swallowed While Riding a Unicycle (three swords swallowed on a 3-metre-tall (9.8 ft) unicycle) and Longest Lightning Bolt to Strike Swallowed Sword. The measured distance the stream of electrical discharge traveled from Australia's largest Tesla coil, owned and operated by Peter Terren (a.k.a. Dr Electric), to the handle of Chayne's swallowed sword was 3 feet 10 inches (117 cm). The sword blade measured 62 centimetres (24 in) and was swallowed all the way to the hilt on April 20, 2013, at Perth, WA, Australia. As of July 2016 The Space Cowboy holds 44 official Guinness World Records. He is Australia's most prolific record breaker.

In 2017, the Guinness World Record for Largest Curve in a Sword Swallowed was achieved by Franz Huber with a 133-degree curved sword.

Brad Byers holds the Guinness World Record for The Most Swords Swallowed and Twisted at One Time by swallowing ten 27 inches (69 cm) swords one at a time and then twisting all ten swords 180 degrees in his throat.

Thomas Blackthorne made the sword known as "The Sword of Swords". It holds the Guinness World Record for the most swallowed sword and has been swallowed by 40 of the world's most known sword swallowers.

Wang Lei from Dezhou, China holds the Guinness World Record for most swords swallowed in three minutes (27).

In 2023, Heather Holliday became the first person to hold a title for swallowing a neon tube.
