= Hypnodog =

Canine stage hypnotist act

Hypnodog is a canine stage hypnotist act.

Professional hypnotist Hugh Lennon discovered Oscar, a 10-month-old black Labrador Retriever puppy, on a farm in Yorkshire. Lennon states that initially he bought Oscar as a pet and brought him to shows for companionship, but "one night I brought him on stage with me. He started staring at this girl and she fell into hypnosis, without me doing a thing". Lennon maintains that a number of dogs and other carnivores have a natural ability to hypnotise prey.

In 1995, Oscar made headlines in the UK and all over the world, when he went missing while appearing at the Edinburgh Fringe in Scotland. Oscar is also familiar to many students of English as a second language, as materials about Oscar and his act are featured in the Oxford University Press English language course.

In 2001, after 12 years performing, Oscar's eyesight failed and he was no longer able to hold the penetrating stare necessary for stage hypnosis. Open auditions were held at the Weymouth Pavilion for a replacement dog; the eventual replacement chosen was Milo, a three-year-old German Shepherd-Rottweiler crossbreed. However, Lennon later worked with Murphy, one of Oscar's sons.

Lennon and the Hypnodog have appeared on numerous television and radio shows, including This Morning and Kelly, and at the Reading and Leeds Festivals.

Hugh retired his act in 2007. Hugh Lennon is now deceased and will be remembered for his work as an extra in Star Wars - A New Hope, where he played the part of a Stormtrooper on the Deathstar as well as a rebel in the briefing room and medal ceremony.

== See also ==
- List of individual dogs
- Hypnotoad
