= Tien Shan Pai =

Northern style of Kung-fu

Tien Shan Pai (天山派)
- Also known as: Celestial Mountain Style, T'ien Shan P'ai
- Focus: Striking, Melee weapons
- Country of origin: Xinjiang Province, China

Tien Shan Pai (天山派, pinyin Tiānshān pài) is a northern style of Kung-fu which stresses rhythm, the demonstration of power accentuated by solid thuds made by the hands, the emitting of power from the entire body, the coordination of the hands and feet as well as blocks and strikes, high kicks and low sweeps, as well as locking and throwing techniques. At the same time it also contains graceful empty-hand and weapons forms.

Tien Shan Pai self-defense is characterized by angular attacks coupled with multiple blocks. If one block fails, the second can cover. Footwork is considered essential to countering attacks. Tien Shan Pai focuses on low and steady steps to the side, along with swift "hidden" steps to trick the opponent. Paired boxing forms and exercises are emphasized for timing and accurate evaluation of distance in reference to a moving, responsive adversary.

According to the legend taught by Master Wang to his students the style originated in the Tien Shan mountains of northwestern China. Master Wang maintained that Tien Shan Pai was an ancient style of more than 60 generations.

By contrast, however, some of Wang's still living senior disciples and students state that Tien Shan Pai is an eclectic system, some of which has older antecedents, but which was first taught as a system by their teacher beginning in the late 1940s.

== History ==
Tian Shai Pai has history more than 800 years, with foundations dating back to 1190.

Wang Chueh-Jen (王玨錱 - also known as Wang Jyue-Jen, and before that as Wang San Jer) came from a wealthy family from Sichuan Province in China. He is credited with bringing the Chinese martial art known as Tien Shan Pai to the public. After training members of Chiang Kai-shek's army in the martial arts, he settled in Taiwan, where he began to teach his curriculum in the late 1940s. Wang's early students competed in tournaments in Taiwan. Most notable among the successes of these early students, was Wu Ming Jer's victory in the International Taiwan-Hong Kong-Macau Tournament (the Tai-Gang-Au) in 1957. In this tournament Wu Ming Jer, won the lightweight division (full contact) championship title.

Together with noted Chinese martial arts Master Chen Pan-Lin and others, Wang co-founded the Chung Hua Kuoshu Federation.

Wang continued to teach Tien Shan Pai, in Taiwan, until his death in 1990. Wang visited the United States four times: three extended stays from 1980-1, 1982-3, and 1985-6, and one brief visit in 1989. During his time in the U.S., he taught at his student's schools, gave interviews on martial arts, and participated in martial arts demonstrations.

Some of the curriculum he incorporated into his teaching included forms from the Central Martial Arts Academy in Nanjing. He also taught the internal arts of taijiquan, xingyiquan and baguazhang.

=== Founding legend ===
Wang Jyue Jen told many of his students a founding legend to instill martial virtue in them. The details of that legend vary in the re-telling, but the story is essentially as follows:

At the urging of his mother, a young shepherd, who would come to be known as Hong Yun (紅雲) / Hung Yun Tzu, that lived in the foothills of the Tien Shan mountain range followed an old monk into the mountains to learn his martial art. Upon proving his dedication to learning, by kneeling in the snow overnight, the shepherd was taken into the monk's temple. After many years of training he left to pass his skill on to other dedicated students.

== Modern practitioners ==
Tien Shan Pai is practiced by many in the United States and around the world. Current Masters in the U.S., all taught by Wang, include (in order of arrival in the U.S.) Willy Lin, Tony Lin, Chien-Liang Huang, and Chao Chi Liu.

Willy Lin was the first of Wang Jyue Jen's disciples to arrive in the US. He is credited as being the first person to introduce, and to teach Wang's system of Tien Shan Pai in the United States. In Taiwan (between 1960–1968,) Lin was Head Instructor and Assistant to Wang, at Wang's "Lei Sheng Wu Yuan", or "Thunder Sound Martial Arts Garden" school. In 1968, Lin emigrated from Taiwan to São Paulo, Brazil. In 1970, he came to the United States, where, in 1971, he opened his first school in the Washington, D.C., area. During the next four years, Lin brought his brother, (Tony Lin,) his brother's friend, (Chien-Liang Huang,) and one of Lin's own Taiwanese Tien Shan Pai classmates (Chao Chi Liu) from Taiwan to the US to become instructors at his Lin Kung Fu Schools. Presently, Willy Lin lives in Seattle, WA where he still teaches privately. He gives workshops and seminars regularly, around the country, on the traditional forms and practices of Tien Shan Pai (as taught to him by Wang, Jyue Jen.) Lin has produced a series of instructional DVDs in order to record Tien Shan Pai's traditional legacy in both the Kung Fu, as well as the Tai Chi aspects. Lin maintains that he is responsible for the naming of the style as "Tien Shan Pai" in the US, that this name encompasses all of Wang's curriculum. He further states that Wang, Jyue Jen is the creator (the Founding Generation) of this style, and that this system, now known as Tien Shan Pai, dates from the 1940s.

Tony Lin spends his time between Maryland and mainland China. He still teaches privately.

Huang Chien-Liang has been teaching and promoting Tien Shan Pai consistently for the past thirty five years. He currently resides in Maryland, and still teaches at his school in Owings Mills, Maryland: The US Kuoshu Academy. Additionally, Huang teaches seminars around the world on Tien Shan Pai and other martial arts styles, and has produced instructional videos on martial arts subjects. Huang is the founder and current President of the Tien Shan Pai Association. The Tien Shan Pai Association "sponsors seminars, produces instructional materials, and publishes a newsletter containing articles and information about the Tien Shan Pai style..." with the intention of making "information about the Tien Shan Pai style more accessible to the public." The Association organizes demonstrations benefiting various charities, and supports and organizes martial arts tournaments. Individual and school memberships are offered in the Tien Shan Pai Association. Huang Chien-Liang has displayed images of a sword crafted by Wang and given to Huang by Wang, where an inscription by Wang on the scabbard states that Huang is a 64th Generation disciple. Additionally, these inscriptions affirm Wang's position as 63rd Generation Grandmaster. Although there are classmates who started training under Wang prior to Huang, Huang claims that he is the only full heir to Wang's Tien Shan Pai style. As evidence of his full, formal discipleship, Huang has said that none of his classmates learned as much of the actual Tien Shan Pai curriculum as he did, that only Huang received the initiatory Taoist disciple name from Wang Chueh-Jen, and that Huang has produced written materials from Wang documenting that the lineage was being passed on through him. Huang has asserted that Tien Shan Pai is its own style in Chinese martial arts, distinct from other styles included in Wang's curriculum. In support of Huang's assertions, he has made available private correspondence from Master Wang where Wang reiterated that Tien Shan Pai is an ancient style. In these letters, Wang also recognized Huang's tremendous contributions to Tien Shan Pai but expressed regrets about the lack of cooperation and personal attacks perpetuated by Huang's classmates in the U.S.

C.C. Liu lives in Washington, DC, where he also still has a school.

== Literature ==
- Chien-Liang Huang; Ian Chisholm (2012). Introduction to Tien Shan Pai: Celestial Mountain Style Kung Fu. Turtle Press. ISBN 9781938585036.
- Lin, Willy (1984). Chinese Grappling: T'ien Shan P'ai CHIN-NA, the Grappling Art of Self-Defense (2002 reprint). Black Belt Communications. ISBN 9780897500951.
