= M. S. Ramaiah Medical College =

Medical College in Bangalore, Karnataka, India

Coordinates: 13°01′50″N 77°33′59″E

Ramaiah Medical College (RMC), previously known as M. S. Ramaiah Medical College (MSRMC), is a tertiary health care center and a medical college situated in Bangalore, Karnataka. The Ramaiah Medical College (RMC) was established in 1979 by the Gokula Education Foundation and was founded by the Late Sri. M S Ramaiah. It is an autonomous institute and affiliated with the Rajiv Gandhi University of Health Sciences, Bengaluru.

The MS Ramaiah Medical College was founded by the Late Sri Mathikere Sampangi Ramaiah in 1979 and as a requisite for medical education, the M. S. Ramaiah Teaching Hospital was founded. With a vision of a multi-speciality centre, the M. S. Ramaiah Institute of Nephro–Urology, M. S. Ramaiah Institute of Oncology and M. S. Ramaiah Institute of Cardiology was set up; the founding of M. S. Ramaiah Medical Teaching Hospital was done in the year 1985. Ramaiah Medical College Hospital is the associated teaching health facility, and is known for its free health camps and awareness programmes. The MS Ramaiah Medical College is now a part of the MSR Group of Institutions, and since 2022, has been affiliated to the new Ramaiah University of Applied Sciences.

== Rankings ==
University and college rankings

Medical – India
- NIRF (2024): 46
- India Today (2024): 26

RMC was ranked 26th among medical colleges in India in 2024 by India Today.

Ramaiah Medical College was ranked 46th by the National Institutional Ranking Framework (NIRF) in 2024.

== Campus & facilities ==
The campus occupies a spacious area of 65 acres and provides various facilities to students like:

- Library
- Hostel
- Laboratories
- Cafeteria
- Sports Complex
- Counselling Cell
- Auditorium
- Security facility including students tracking system
