= Sivamani (percussionist) =

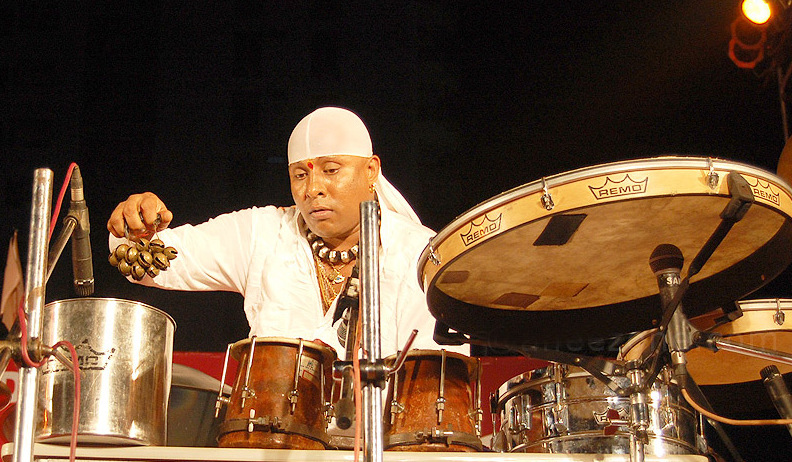

Background information
- Born: Anandan Sivamani; 1 December 1959 (age 66); Madras, Madras State (now Chennai, Tamil Nadu) India
- Occupations: Percussionist; Composer
- Years active: 1971–present
- Spouses: Krashani (divorced); Runa Rizvi (m. 2014)
- Website: www.sivamani.in
- Awards: Kalaimamani (2009); Padma Shri (2019)

Anandan "Drums" Sivamani (born 1 December 1959) is an Indian percussionist. He plays many instruments including drums, octoban, darbuka, udukai, ghatam and kanjira. He gained recognition through his role as A. R. Rahman's lead percussionist. They have been close friends since childhood. He was also the lead percussion performer for the Chennai Super Kings cheerleading squad during the Indian Premier League from 2008 to 2012. In 2019, he was conferred with the Padma Shri.

== Career ==
Sivamani is a Chennai-based percussionist. He began drumming at the age of seven. Sivamani started his musical career at the age of 11, and later shifted to Mumbai. He was inspired by Noel Grant and Billy Cobham. He has played for M.S.Viswanathan, K.V. Mahadevan, G. Devarajan, Illayaraja, A. R. Rahman and others. In 1990, he shared the stage with Billy Cobham at Mumbai's Rang Bhavan. He has stated that S. P. Balasubrahmanyam is his godfather.

Sivamani's earliest experiments with music were with Carnatic maestros including Kunnakudi Vaidyanathan, T. V. Gopalakrishnan, Valliyapatti Subramaniam and Pazhanivel, and L. Shankar. During the early stage of his career, he collaborated with T. Rajendar for many of his music compositions. Sivamani also appeared on screen for the song " Dhinam Dhinam Un Mugam" alongside Actor Anand Babu for the movie "Thangaikkor Geetham" directed by T. Rajendar. The tabla player Zakir Hussain invited him to share the stage with himself and Trilok Gurtu at a fusion concert in Mumbai. Sivamani has since collaborated with several musicians including Louis Banks. He has done world tours with A. R. Rahman and collaborated with him for Bombay Dreams. He has also been a part of a musical group called Shraddha which comprises Shankar Mahadevan, Hariharan, U. Srinivas and Loy Mendonsa.

Sivamani has a band called "Asia Electrik" with Niladri Kumar, Louiz Banks and Ravi Chari. He also plays at another world music band named "Silk & Shrada."

Sivamani has played drums for many film score composers hailing from Tamil Nadu. He has played drums for many Indian films including Roja, Rang De Basanti,Swades, Taal, Lagaan, Dil Se.., Guru,Kabul Express and Rockstar . Some of the songs that he has contributed to include "Kadhal Rojave," "Pudhu Vellai Malai" Chaiya Chaiya and Nadaan Parinde.

Sivamani has also acted in two Telugu films: Padamati Sandhya Ragam and Sirivennela. He has also acted in the Hindi film Madaari (2016).

Sivamani has performed in Dubai, Moscow, New York, Doha and Toronto. During the Mumbai Festival 2005, Coca-Cola India invited him to perform at the Limca Fresh Face 2005 event, where he created melody from Limca bottles. He has also worked on Galli Galli Sim Sim, an educational series on Pogo and Cartoon Network. He also composed music for the ZEE5 original film Atkan Chatkan (2020) where he worked alongside A. R. Rahman.

== Personal life ==
Sivamani was married to Krashani, with whom he has two children; the couple divorced later. On 10 November 2014, he married singer Runa Rizvi in a private ceremony in Mumbai.

Sivamani's son Kumaran is also a percussionist, working for ARR.

== Awards and recognitions ==
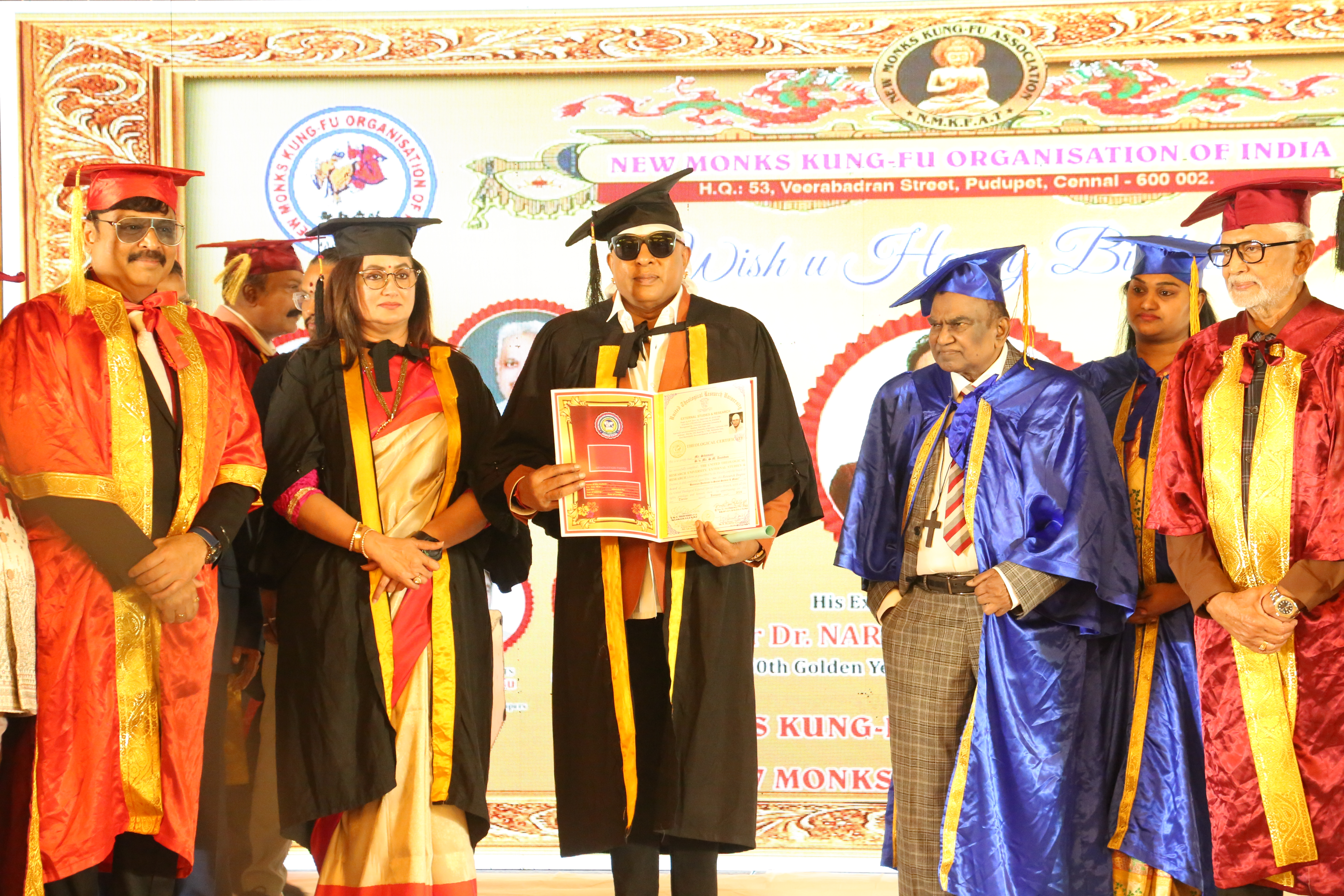
Sivamani With honorary doctorate

In 2009, Sivamani was conferred upon with the title of Kalaimamani by the Government of Tamil Nadu, which is the highest State Honour in the field of arts. In 2015, he was honoured with the ‘Best Instrumental Act’ at the prestigious LIVE Quotients Awards (LQA 2015).

In 2019, Sivamani was conferred upon with the title of Padma Shri by the Government of India.

Sivamani received honorary doctorate from United Technological Research University of America on 20 January 2024 in Hyderabad.

== Albums ==
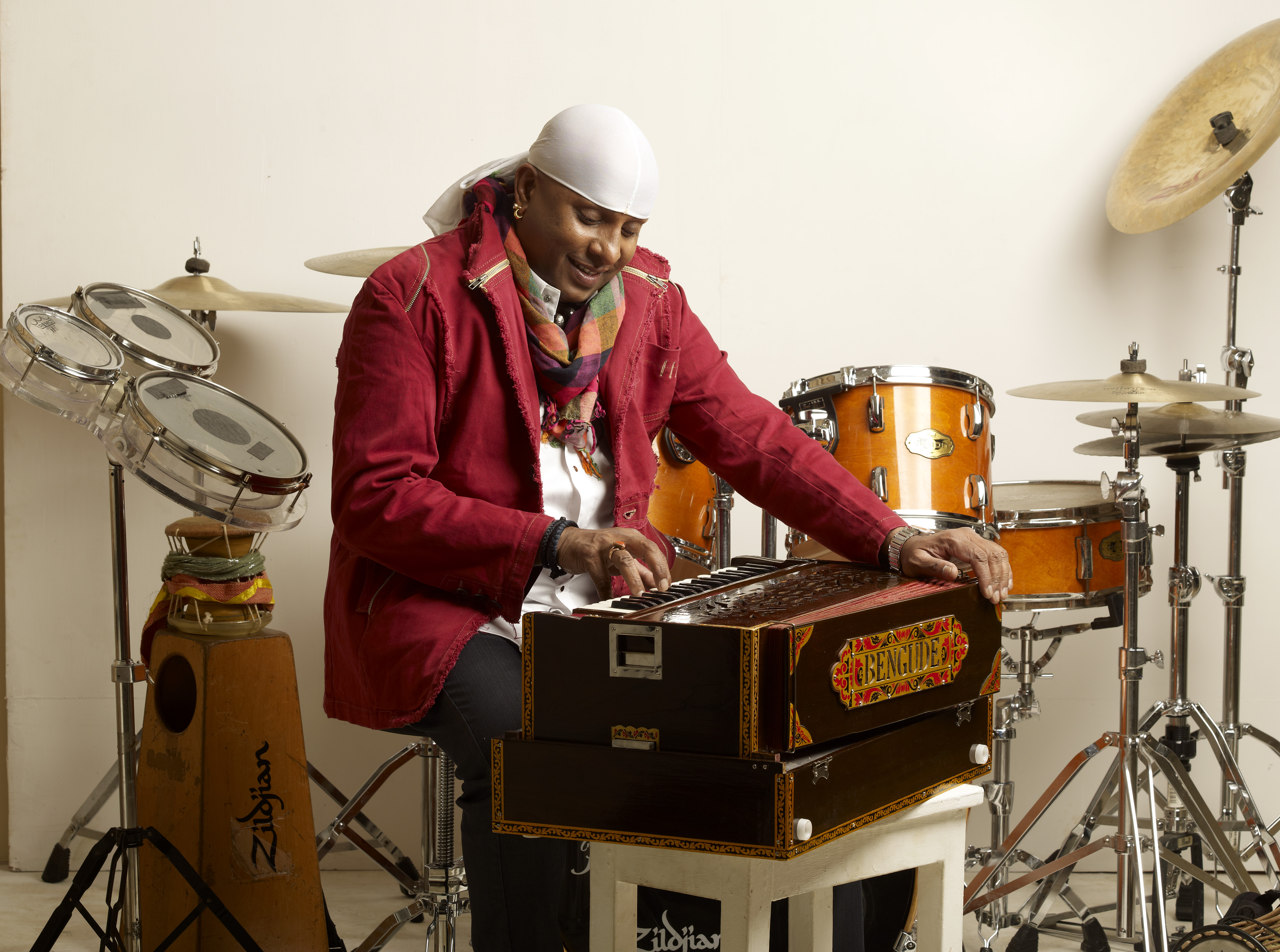

- Golden Krithis Colours, (1994) a Carnatic Experimental album. BMG Crescendo (collaboration with A. S. Dilip Kumar (A. R. Rahman), Zaakir Husain and Srinivasan and Kunnakudi Vaidyanathan)
- Pure Silk (2000)
- Krishna Krishna, a club track released in UK, with Malayalam composer Rahul Raj.
- Drums on Fire (2003). New Earth (collaboration with James Asher)
- Kaash (first ghazal album with Hariharan)
- Mahaleela (first individual album by Sivamani)
- Arima Nambi (2014)
- Kanithan (2016)
- Amali Thumali (unreleased)

== Filmography ==
- Sirivennela; Telugu (cameo) (1986)
- Padamati Sandhya Ragam; Telugu (supporting actor) (1987)
- Arima Nambi; Tamil (music director) (2014)
- Madaari; Hindi (Drums Artist) (2016)
- Kanithan; Tamil (music director) (2016)
- Mersal; Tamil (Drums Artist) (2017)
- Aravinda Sametha Veera Raghava; Telugu (Drums Artist) (2018)
- Arjun Suravaram; Telugu (producer for song "Che Guevara", beat reused from Kanithan) (2019)
- Ala Vaikunthapurramuloo; Telugu for the single "Ramuloo Ramulaa"(Drums Artist) (2020)
- Dehati Disco; Hindi (music director) (2022)
- Quotation Gang Part 1; Tamil (music director) (2024)
