= Lydian Nadhaswaram =

Indian musician

- Born: Lydian Nadhaswaram; 5 September 2005 (age 21); Chennai, Tamil Nadu, India
- Occupations: Musician; Pianist; Keyboardist; Music Composer
- Years active: 2019–present
- Known for: Winning the 2019 CBS talent show, The World's Best
- Father: Varshan
- Awards: 2019 World's Best Performer Award by CBS

Lydian Nadhaswaram (born 5 September 2005) is an Indian Tamil musician from Chennai, Tamil Nadu. In 2019, he appeared on The World's Best on CBS and won, earning prize money of $1 million.

== Early life ==
Nadhaswaram was born to Varshan Satish, a Tamil music director, and Jhansi as their second child. At the age of two, he started performing on the drums, and at eight he taught himself to play the piano. He is a student of Augustine Paul, the music director of the century-old Madras Musical Association Choir.

Nadhaswaram spent four years studying at KM Music Conservatory, a higher education institution founded in 2008 by the AR Rahman Foundation. In a YouTube video, Nadhaswaram was at home playing a Vande Matram song by A.R. Rahman on the piano in front of the composer.

In September 2019, it was announced that Nadhaswaram would make his debut as a film composer with the Malayalam-language fantasy film Barroz 3D – Guardian of D'Gama's Treasure, directed by Mohanlal, starring himself in the lead. He played the role of Guddu in the film Atkan Chatkan.

== Award ==
Nadhaswaram was awarded the Lokmat Sur Jytosna National Music Award in 2021, which was given away by the information and broadcast Minister Anurag Thakur.

== See also ==
- List of child music prodigies
