= The World's Best =

Reality talent competition television series

- Genre: Reality; Talent contest
- Created by: Mike Darnell; Mark Burnett
- Directed by: Alex Rudzinski
- Presented by: James Corden
- Judges: Drew Barrymore; RuPaul; Faith Hill; The Wall of the World
- Country of origin: United States
- Original language: English
- No. of seasons: 1
- No. of episodes: 12

Production
- Executive producers: Mike Darnell; Mark Burnett; Ben Winston; James Corden; Brooke Karzen; Barry Poznick; Dan Sacks; Alison Holloway; James Breen
- Production locations: Television City; Hollywood, California
- Running time: 60 minutes
- Production companies: Fulwell 73 Productions; MGM Television; Warner Horizon Television

Original release
- Network: CBS
- Release: February 3 – March 13, 2019

The World's Best is an American reality talent competition television series that aired on CBS. Created by Mark Burnett and Mike Darnell, and hosted by comedian James Corden, the series featured performers being evaluated by three judges and the "Wall of the World"—an international panel of 50 experts in various forms of entertainment.

It premiered on CBS on February 3, 2019; its first and only season was won by Indian pianist Lydian Nadhaswaram.

== Production ==
CBS ordered The World's Best in February 2018; CBS SVP of alternative programming Sharon Vuong credited Mark Burnett and Mike Darnell's experience in the reality genre, stating that they "understand how to create compelling competition and build enduring franchises", and that it would be a "unique, original format with global scale". Darnell felt that The World's Best was "the next new spin on a variety show", and defended comparisons to a competitor, NBC's America's Got Talent (which, in May, would announce an all-star spin-off series, America's Got Talent: The Champions) by emphasizing its "dramatic" scoring system and international focus as differentiating it from other talent competition series. James Corden, then-host of CBS's The Late Late Show, would serve as host.

== Format ==
Each act is judged by three main judges of American origin, as well as the "Wall of the World" — an international panel of 50 experts in various fields of entertainment. Each judge scores a performance on a scale from 0 to 50, while each member of the Wall panel can give a yes or no vote. The average of the judges' scores, and the number of votes given by the Wall, are totaled into a maximum possible score of 100.

Acts who achieved at least 75 points advance to the Battle round, where the acts are paired into duels against each other. In each battle, the judges score the acts in a similar manner to the audition round, but the Wall votes between the two acts instead.

In the Champions round, the twelve acts who advanced from the battles are grouped into four divisions (consisting of solo and group competitions in "Music" and "Variety" categories) with three acts each. The act with the lowest score from the American judges is automatically given third place, and a finalist is determined between the remaining two with the main judges' score and the Wall's votes, in the same manner as the Battle round. The winning finalists in each category also each receive a $50,000 prize.

In the finale, semi-final performances are conducted between the solo and group champions in the Music and Variety categories. The winners of each advance to the finals to determine the champion, who wins a $1,000,000 grand prize.

== Broadcast ==
The World's Best premiered on February 3, 2019, following the conclusion of CBS' coverage of Super Bowl LIII.

In August 2019, CBS president of entertainment Kelly Kahl stated that the network had not yet decided whether The World's Best would be renewed for a second season. Kahl explained that the network "enjoyed the show creatively", but that they would "probably tweak the format a little" if renewed. As of April 2021, CBS had not renewed the series.

== Panelists ==
The members of the "Wall of the World" include:

Country	Continent	Judge	Occupation
Australia	Oceania	Aaron Cash	Dancer and choreographer
Mexico	America	Alberto Belli	Director
South Korea	Asia	Alex Wright	K-pop producer
Brazil	America	Anderson Silva	MMA fighter, former and longest-reigning holder of the UFC Middleweight Championship
Netherlands	Europe	Angela Groothuizen	Singer and TV personality
Colombia	America	Ariadna Gutiérrez	Miss Colombia 2014, Miss Universe 2015 runner-up
Armenia	Asia	Arthur Gourounlian	Creative director and choreographer
(Islamic Republic of Afghanistan) Afghanistan	Asia	Aryana Sayeed	Singer and TV personality
Spain	Europe	Carlos Latre	Comedian and actor
Ireland	Europe	Caroline Morahan	Actress and TV host
Denmark	Europe	Cecilie Lassen	Ballet dancer
Netherlands	Europe	Chantal Janzen	Actress, singer and TV presenter
Brazil	America	Chinzõ Machida	Shotokan black belt
United Kingdom	Europe	Dave Eringa	Record producer
United Kingdom	Europe	Del Mak	Choreographer
Germany	Europe	Dennis Jauch	Dancer and choreographer
France	Europe	Essaï Altounian	Musician
Bulgaria	Europe	Galabina Kamenova	Gymnast
Greece	Europe	Galena Velikova	Dancesport athlete
Kazakhstan	Asia	Gia Noortas	Actress and filmmaker
Japan	Asia	Hokuto Konishi	Dancer and choreographer
Poland	Europe	Ida Nowakowska	Actress and ballerina
Germany	Europe	Jorge González	TV personality
Nigeria	Africa	Kate Henshaw	Actress
China	Asia	Kathy Wu	Actress and TV personality
Canada	America	Keshia Chanté	Singer and songwriter
Israel	Asia	Kobi Rozenfeld	Choreographer and creative director
South Africa	Africa	Lira	Musician
Panama	America	Luigie "Lugo" Gonzalez	Record producer
Japan	Asia	Makoto Deguchi	Theater producer
Sweden	Europe	Margareta Svensson	Musical artist and vocal coach
India	Asia	Nakul Dev Mahajan	Bollywood choreographer
Canada	America	Nathalie Yves Gauthier	Circus expert
Germany	Europe	Nazan Eckes	TV host and judge
Mexico	America	Patricia Manterola	Telenovela star and singer
Ecuador	America	Paulina Aguirre	Singer
Switzerland	Europe	Petra Sprecher	Stuntwoman
Philippines	Asia	Pops Fernandez	Musician and TV personality
Samoa	Oceania	Rikishi	Professional wrestler, WWE Hall of Fame performer
Mongolia	Asia	Rokit Bay	Rapper and music producer
United Kingdom	Europe	Ross King	Broadcaster
Colombia	America	Sergio Trujillo	Broadway choreographer
South Africa	Africa	Shado Twala	Radio and TV personality
United Kingdom	Europe	Sisco Gomez	Choreographer and TV personality
Russia	Europe	Slava N. Jakovleff	Film director and TV producer
Belgium	Europe	Slongs Dievanongs	Rapper
Canada	America	Stu Golfman	Comedy talent agent
United Kingdom	Europe	Stuart MacLeod	Magician
South Africa	Africa	Tats Nkonzo	Comedian and musician
Vietnam	Asia	Thai Nguyen	Fashion designer and TV personality
China	Asia	William Yuekun Yu	Peking opera actor
Czech Republic	Europe	Yemi A.D.	Celebrity choreographer and creative director
United Kingdom	Europe	Zoë Tyler	Vocal coach and TV personality
Nigeria	Africa	Zora DeHorter	International casting director

== Season 1 (2019) ==
=== Auditions ===
- The act received enough points to advance to the next round
- The act did not receive enough points to advance to the next round

Week 1

Act	Country	Talent	Judge Score	Wall Score	Final score
Kukkiwon	South Korea	Martial Arts Acrobats	49	50	99
TNT Boys	Philippines	Singing Trio	49	50	99
Space Cowboy	Australia	Sword Swallower	32	25	57
Enkh Erdene	Mongolia	Country Singer	48	49	97
Manami Ito	Japan	Violinist	40	46	86
Matt Johnson	United Kingdom	Escape Artist	45	36	81

Week 2

Act	Country	Talent	Judge Score	Wall Score	Final Score
Naturally 7	United States	Acapella Group	47	48	95
Dundu	Germany	Puppetry Performers	48	49	97
Iya Traoré	Guinea	Soccer Freestyler	35	29	64
Sister Cristina Scuccia	Italy	Singing Nun	41	37	78
Justin Flom	United States	Magician	49	46	95
Duo Suining	China	Hand Balancers	46	45	91
Lydian Nadhaswaram	India	Pianist	41	44	85
Krystyna & Princess	United Kingdom	Hypnodog	29	12	41
Jordan McKnight	United States	Contortionist	49	42	91
Kai & Alexandra	Switzerland	Upside Down Clown Duo	36	33	69
Jade Kindar-Martin	United States	Highwire Walker	35	36	71
Dimash Kudaibergen	Kazakhstan	Vocally Diverse Singer	50	48	98

Week 3

Act	Country	Talent	Judge Score	Wall Score	Final Score
Shaolin Yanze	China	Kung Fu	43	46	89
Daneliya Tuleshova	Kazakhstan	Singer	47	49	96
Nina Conti	United Kingdom	Ventriloquist	42	43	85
Duo Nigretai	Brazil	Aerialist Duo	37	44	81
Liliac Band	United States	Rock Band	48	43	91
Emotional Line	South Korea	Popping Dance Group	39	30	69
William Close	United States	Earth Harp Player & Creator	42	45	87
Los Vivancos	Spain	Variety Dancers	42	42	84
Li Wei	China	Slackline Daredevil	44	46	90
Vonnie Lopez	United States	Gospel Singer	48	44	92

=== Battle Rounds ===
- The act won the battle and advanced to the next round
- The act lost the battle and did not advance to the next round

Week 4

Order	Act	Country	Talent	Judge Score	Wall Score	Final score
1	Justin Flom	United States	Magician	45	35	80
1	Jordan McKnight	United States	Contortionist	42	15	57
2	Lydian Nadhaswaram	India	Pianist	43	31	74
2	Enkh Erdene	Mongolia	Country Singer	45	19	64
3	Matt Johnson	United Kingdom	Escape Artist	34	17	51
3	Li Wei	China	Slackline Daredevil	40	33	73
4	Manami Ito	Japan	Violinist	37	23	60
4	Daneliya Tuleshova	Kazakhstan	Singer	44	27	71
5	Sister Cristina Scuccia	Italy	Singing Nun	35	4	39
5	Dimash Kudaibergen	Kazakhstan	Vocally Diverse Singer	48	46	94

Week 5

Order	Act	Country	Talent	Judge Score	Wall Score	Final score
1	Los Vivancos	Spain	Variety Dancers	42	17	59
1	Kukkiwon	South Korea	Martial Arts Acrobats	50	33	83
2	Nina Conti	United Kingdom	Ventriloquist	42	39	81
2	Space Cowboy	Australia	Sword Swallower	33	11	44
3	William Close	United States	Earth Harp Player	39	1	40
3	Naturally 7	United States	Acapella Group	46	49	95
4	Duo Suining	China	Hand Balancers	38	13	51
4	Dundu	Germany	Puppetry Performers	41	37	78
5	TNT Boys	Philippines	Singing Trio	50	47	97
5	Emotional Line	South Korea	Popping Dance Group	40	3	43

Week 6

Order	Act	Country	Talent	Judge Score	Wall Score	Final score
1	Shaolin Yanze	China	Kung Fu	43	28	71
1	Duo Nigretai	Brazil	Aerialist Duo	43	22	65
2	Liliac Band	United States	Rock Band	43	14	57
2	Vonnie Lopez	United States	Gospel Singer	47	36	83

=== Champion Rounds ===
- The act won the category and advanced to the next round
- The act came in second in the category and did not advance to the next round
- The act finished in third place after receiving the lowest rating from the American judges
- The act decided to withdraw from the competition

Category	Act	Country	Talent	Judge Score	Wall Score	Final score
Solo Variety	Justin Flom	United States	Magician	42	24	66
Solo Variety	Li Wei	China	Slackline Daredevil	—N/a		3rd place
Solo Variety	Nina Conti	United Kingdom	Ventriloquist	45	26	71
Group Music	Naturally 7	United States	Acapella Group	43	32	75
Group Music	Vonnie Lopez	United States	Gospel Singer	—N/a		3rd place
Group Music	TNT Boys	Philippines	Singing Trio	49	18	67
Group Variety	Kukkiwon	South Korea	Martial Arts Acrobats	50	33	83
Group Variety	Dundu	Germany	Puppetry Performers	48	17	65
Group Variety	Shaolin Yanze	China	Kung Fu	—N/a		3rd place
Solo Music	Daneliya Tuleshova	Kazakhstan	Singer	48	7	55
Solo Music	Lydian Nadhaswaram	India	Pianist	44	43	87
Solo Music	Dimash Kudaibergen	Kazakhstan	Vocally Diverse Singer	—N/a		Withdrew

=== Finale ===
Category	Act	Country	Talent	Judge Score	Wall Score	Final score
Music	Lydian Nadhaswaram	India	Pianist	47	34	81
Music	Naturally 7	United States	Acapella Group	48	16	64
Variety	Kukkiwon	South Korea	Martial Arts Acrobats	48	30	78
Variety	Nina Conti	United Kingdom	Ventriloquist	43	20	63
Final 2	Kukkiwon	South Korea	Martial Arts Acrobats	50	13	63
Final 2	Lydian Nadhaswaram	India	Pianist	47	37	84

== Elimination Table ==
- Emotional Line and Space Cowboy were brought back to the Battle Rounds to fill out The Top 24.

Act	Country	Talent	Position Reached
Lydian Nadhaswaram	India	Pianist	Winner
Kukkiwon	South Korea	Martial Arts Acrobats	Runner-Up
Nina Conti	United Kingdom	Ventriloquist	Top 4
Naturally 7	United States	Acapella Group	Top 4
Daneliya Tuleshova	Kazakhstan	Singer	Top 8
Dundu	Germany	Puppetry Performers	Top 8
TNT Boys	Philippines	Singing Trio	Top 8
Justin Flom	United States	Magician	Top 8
Dimash Kudaibergen	Kazakhstan	Vocally Diverse Singer	Withdrew; Top 12
Shaolin Yanze	China	Kung Fu	Top 12
Vonnie Lopez	United States	Gospel Singer	Top 12
Li Wei	China	Slackline Daredevil	Top 12
Liliac Band	United States	Rock Band	Top 24
Duo Nigretai	Brazil	Aerialist Duo	Top 24
Emotional Line	South Korea	Popping Dance Group	Top 24
Duo Suining	China	Hand Balancers	Top 24
William Close	United States	Earth Harp Player & Creator	Top 24
Space Cowboy	Australia	Sword Swallower	Top 24
Los Vivancos	Spain	Variety Dancers	Top 24
Sister Cristina Scuccia	Italy	Singing Nun	Top 24
Manami Ito	Japan	Violinist	Top 24
Matt Johnson	United Kingdom	Escape Artist	Top 24
Enkh Erdene	Mongolia	Country Singer	Top 24
Jordan McKnight	United States	Contortionist	Top 24
Jade Kindar-Martin	United States	Highwire Walker	Eliminated
Kai & Alexandra	Switzerland	Upside Down Clown Duo	Eliminated
Krystyna & Princess	United Kingdom	Hypnodog	Eliminated
Iya Traoré	Guinea	Soccer Freestyler	Eliminated

== Ratings ==
#	Air Date	18–49 (rating/share)	Viewers (millions)	Source
1	February 3, 2019	7.0/29	22.21	
2/3	February 6, 2019	1.0/5	5.56	
4	February 13, 2019	0.9/5	5.85	
5/6	February 20, 2019	0.6/3	3.65	
7/8	February 27, 2019	0.4/2	2.64	
9/10	March 6, 2019	0.6/3	2.90	
11/12	March 13, 2019	0.6/3	3.60	

== Contestants who appeared on other shows ==
- Sister Cristina Scuccia won the second season of The Voice of Italy and competed in the 14th Italian version of Dancing with the Stars, where she made it to the semifinals.
- Daneliya Tuleshova represented Kazakhstan at the Junior Eurovision Song Contest 2018 finishing in sixth position. She participated in The Voice Kids Ukraine in 2017 and won, and also, in 2018 she won "BRAVO AWARDS" in Russia. She later went on the fifteenth season of America's Got Talent, where she made it to the finale.
- Dimash Kudaibergen was the 2015 Grand Prix champion of the International Festival of Arts Slavianski Bazaar. He then became runner-up during the fifth season of China's I Am a Singer.
- Enkh Erdene was the second season winner of Mongolia's Got Talent.
- Jordan McKnight competed on the tenth season of America's Got Talent, where she passed through the auditions but did not make the Top 80.
- Krystyna & Princess appeared on the ninth series of Britain's Got Talent, where they passed through the auditions but did not make the Semifinals.
- Matt Johnson made it to the semifinals in series 12 of Britain's Got Talent.
- Space Cowboy competed on multiple seasons of Australia's Got Talent, most recently in 2019.
- TNT Boys won the second season of Philippines' Your Face Sounds Familiar Kids; then appeared on Little Big Shots, Little Big Shots UK, and the Little Big Shots Australia, Little Big Shots (China) in 2018.
- William Close competed on the seventh season of America's Got Talent. He finished in third place.
- Liliac, like Daneliya, also competed on the fifteenth season of America's Got Talent. After passing the auditions, the band posted a YouTube video that revealed they had to withdraw before the second round after they were asked to sign a contract that would entitle the show to 99% of their profits over a 5-year period.
