= Runa Rizvi =

Indian singer

- Genres: Hindustani classical music
- Instrument: singing
- Spouse: Sivamani (m. 2014)

Runa Rizvi, also known as Runa Rizvi Sivamani, is an Indian classical and Bollywood playback singer. She sings Sufi songs, folk, Bollywood movies etc.

== Early life ==
Runa Rizvi was born in Bombay to Indian singers Rajkumar Rizvi and Indrani Rizvi. She graduated from Mithibai College, Mumbai.

She belongs to the Kalavant gharana and has been trained in classical, semi-classical and light classical music and can sing Hindi film songs, ghazals, thumri, Folk, Punjabi and Sufi Music, as well as Western and Pop music.

== Career ==
She sang for the Rajshri film Uff kya jaadu mohabbat hai along with Kunal Ganjawala . She sang a song, Jaane tu mera kya hai (Aditi), for the movie Jaane Tu Ya Jaane Na. In 2011, Runa has rendered playback for the film Provoked starring Aishwarya Rai.

She also worked with Prem Joshua and his band for their album, Luminous Secrets.

== Personal life ==
Rizvi married Sivamani on 10 November 2014 in a private ceremony in Mumbai.
