= American Dime Museum =

Defunct museum in Baltimore, Maryland, US

Coordinates: 39°18′36″N 76°37′4.3″W

The American Dime Museum (ADM) was co-founded in Baltimore, Maryland, United States, by artist and antique dealer Richard Horne and James Taylor, writer and publisher of the sideshow journal Shocked and Amazed! Opening November 1, 1999, the museum recreated, in spirit, the dime museums which saw their heyday in the 19th and early 20th centuries in the United States. The museum closed officially in late 2006, but a revived incarnation, Pexcho's American Dime Museum, is open in Augusta, Georgia.

== Description ==
The museum started out as two rooms of its 1808 Maryland Avenue address, which had previously been Horne's antique shop and art studio, Time Bandit, which became Horne's moniker and nickname. Early on, the museum expanded to include the entire first floor of 1808 (the galleries in homage to dime museum attractions), a lower gallery (which housed the sideshow attractions), and the first floor of 1806 Maryland Ave. (devoted to old-time stage performance and natural history attractions). At one point, for a brief period, the museum also included a wax gallery located in the front room of 1804. Its wax show was the Lord's Last Supper, a staple of wax museums and traveling shows for decades, the display based in the famous Da Vinci artwork.

During its years of operation, the ADM or “the Dime,” as it was known to many, showcased an array of permanent attractions, many authentic and many “authentic fakes” or gaffs as they would be termed by show people. Such manufactured attractions were the forte of Horne, whose artworks in that vein included the Samoan Sea Wurm (a “mummified” sea serpent carcass showcased with a bite of fur from the shipboard cat it had supposedly eaten) and Lincoln's Last Turd (a gaff of a gaff, actually, since it was displayed as a fake made not by Horne but by another who had tried to cash in on the craze for Lincoln memorabilia by faking the assassinated president's last bowel movement). Between Horne's gaff artworks, the tongue-in-cheek signs throughout the museum, the wild assortment of off-beat attractions, and the uproarious periodic live shows given off-site (since the museum had no space for performance), the museum garnered a vast amount of publicity including write ups in The New York Times, The Washington Post, The Japan Times, The Baltimore Sun and travel magazines, including National Geographic Traveler. It was also featured frequently on both television and radio, from two segments on National Public Radio to an episode of National Geographic Channel's Mummy Roadshow, the episode focusing on the museum's giant mummy. The museum was also the site of filming for numerous television documentaries on the subject of sideshows and “weirdness as entertainment,” usually featuring Taylor in his capacity as variety entertainment historian.

The museum's front window also showcased a reproduction of Haussner's Restaurant's legendary ball of string.

== Closing ==
Horne and Taylor parted ways in November 2003, and Horne continued to operate the museum until its closure and his auctioning of his half of the collection in February 2007. Taylor, after leaving the partnership and removing his half of the museum attractions, almost immediately began work on another museum in Washington, D.C., the Palace of Wonders, a museum which also featured regular stage performances, performances being an old-time dime museum feature for which the American Dime Museum simply never had the space. The Palace of Wonders opened in June 2006.

== Reopening and the next generation ==
After visiting the American Dime Museum in Baltimore, Maryland in 2002, the erotic artist Peter Excho (Pexcho) was captivated by the "Time Bandit" and proprietor, Dick Horne. Very soon after, Pexcho became a volunteer at the American Dime Museum and began his tutelage in the lost art of preserving the Sideshow or freakshow that P.T. Barnum began in the late 19th century.

After the auction of Dick Horne's Collection in 2007, Pexcho returned to Baton Rouge, Louisiana, where he reopened his coffee and art house, Insomkneeacks, next to the Old Broadmoor Theater on Florida Boulevard in a rundown shopping center built in Baton Rouge during the 1960s.

During and after his apprenticeship with Dick Horne, Pexcho began collecting wonders and oddities of his own through the use of the Internet. Pexcho had several exhibits bequeathed to him from Horne's collection at the Baltimore American Dime Museum and won a few at the museum's auction of 2007. With Horne's approval, Pexcho started constructing and building within Insomkneeacks III in Baton Rouge, a new and revitalized American Dime Museum, with living and preserved specimens of both the natural and unnatural world. Featuring a menagerie of infant animals from North America, Pexcho's American Dime Museum in 2011 now contains wonders and curiosities that cannot be found anywhere else.

What began with "Curiosity Cabinets" in wealthy homes in the late 19th century has now evolved into a living document and testament to a nearly forgotten past and a hopeful future, where "normal" is the oddity. Peter Excho has revived and rebooted the American Dime Museum for the next generation of doubters, gawkers and non-Believers, preserving and displaying truly wonderful, exotic, rare and fantastic anomalies that occur and exist to this day. Peter Excho is the new caretaker of a legacy that began with Barnum, and through Dick Horne's dedication, passion and vision, Pexcho gives visitors and patrons a glimpse and respite into the past, providing the ability for the public to experience an authentic Victorian era American Dime Museum in the 21st Century.

As of June 8, 2019, Pexcho moved his American Dime Museum to Augusta, Georgia and re-opened it there.
