= Sideshow: Alive on the Inside =

1999 American documentary film

- DVD box art
- Directed by: Lynn Dougherty
- Produced by: Lynn Dougherty
- Starring: Percilla Bejano; Ronnie Gaylon; Donnie Gaylon; Jeanie Tomaini
- Narrated by: Jason Alexander
- Cinematography: Michael Mayers
- Edited by: Penny Trams
- Music by: Richard Fiocca
- Animation by: Berle Cherney
- Production company: Big Chief Entertainment
- Distributed by: Image Entertainment
- Release date: March 5, 1999
- Running time: 115 minutes
- Country: United States
- Language: English

Sideshow: Alive on the Inside is an American documentary film directed by Lynn Dougherty and released in 1999. It was narrated by Jason Alexander and features interviews with living sideshow performers as well as archival footage of historical performers. It was released on DVD (box art pictured) and VHS (alternate box art, not pictured) by Image Entertainment and Big Chief Entertainment.

== Cast ==
The film features interviews with Percilla Bejano (“The Monkey Girl”), Jeanie Tomaini (“The World's Only Living Half-Woman”), Melvin Burkhardt (human blockhead, sword swallower, magician), Siamese Twins Ronnie and Donnie Gaylon, the Wolf Boys of Mexico, Sandy Allen (the World's Tallest Woman) and archival footage of deceased sideshow performers such as Jóhann Pétursson (“The Viking Giant”).

== Reception ==
The review aggregator website Rotten Tomatoes reported an 89% approval rating based on over 50 reviews, too few to show an average rating out of five stars.
