= William Durks =

American sideshow performer (1913–1975)

Bill Durks
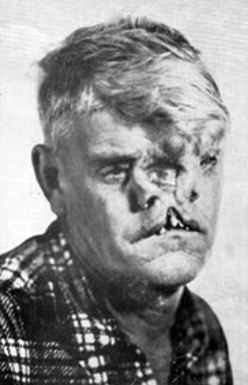
- Portrait of William Durks.
- Born: William Durks; April 13, 1913; Jasper, Alabama
- Died: May 7, 1975 (aged 62); Gibsonton, Florida
- Other name: Bill Durks
- Occupation: Sideshow performer
- Employers: Ripley's Believe It or Not!; The Charles Hodges Side Show; James E. Strates Shows; Hubert’s Museum
- Known for: Performing as “The Man With Three Eyes”
- Spouse: Mildred Durks

William "Bill" Durks (April 13, 1913 – May 7, 1975) was an American sideshow performer best known as "The Man With Three Eyes", a stage persona based on his congenital craniofacial differences. During a career spanning more than four decades, he performed with major American carnival and museum shows, including Ripley's Believe It or Not!, James E. Strates Shows, Hubert's Museum, and the Charles Hodges Side Show. He later performed with his wife, Mildred Durks, billed together as "The World's Strangest Married Couple".

His appearance was promoted as a medical curiosity, although the "third eye" for which he became famous was a painted illusion rather than an anatomical feature.

== Early life ==
William Durks was born in Jasper, Alabama in 1913 to a family of farmers. Durks was born to unaffected parents and had four unaffected siblings.

== Medical condition ==
At birth, Durks had severe congenital craniofacial differences that have been described in published sources as both frontonasal dysplasia and diprosopus. His facial differences included a deeply cleft lip and palate, a bifid (split) nose consisting of two side-by-side nasal structures, each with a single nostril, and eyelids that were fused at birth. During childhood, his eyelids were surgically opened, and most published accounts state that he was blind in one eye.

Sideshow historian Ward Hall described Durks's appearance by writing that he "looked like he had been hit in the face with an axe".

== Career ==
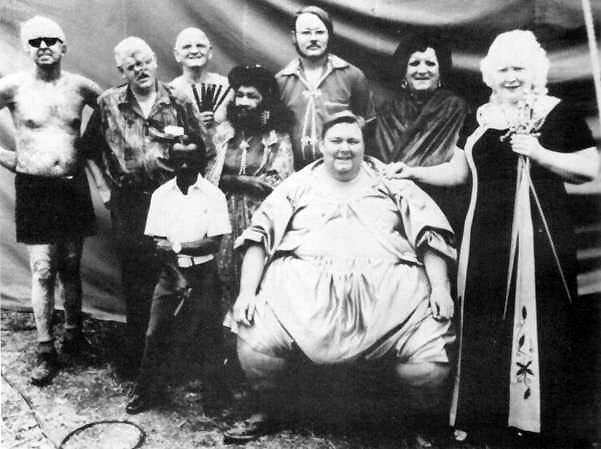
William Durks (second from top left) among other sideshow performers on James E. Strates Shows.

Durks entered the sideshow business at the age of fourteen, beginning with a Single-O show, a type of travelling sideshow, where he was billed as "The Man with Two Noses and Three Eyes".

Over the following decades, he became a regular attraction with a number of American carnival and museum shows, including Ripley's Believe It or Not!, James E. Strates Shows, Hubert's Museum in New York City, and the Charles Hodges Side Show.

Although he was born with two eyes, Durks was most widely promoted throughout his career as "The Man With Three Eyes". As part of the illusion, a third eye was painted onto the centre of his forehead, while his congenital facial differences were presented to audiences as a medical curiosity and carnival attraction.

Durks frequently appeared alongside other sideshow performers in travelling exhibitions and promotional photographs for James E. Strates Shows.

== Married life ==
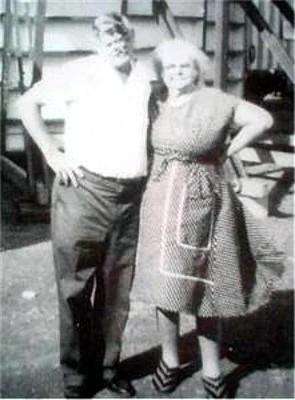
Bill and his wife Mildred.

His wife, Mildred Durks, was also a performer billed as "The Alligator Woman" due to her lamellar ichthyosis. They married and performed together as "The World's Strangest Married Couple" until Mildred’s death in 1968. This title was used by multiple other married sideshow couples for promotional purposes. Other "World's Strangest Married Couples" include Al and Jeanie Tomaini, and Percilla and Emmitt Bejano.

== Death ==
Following the death of his wife Mildred in 1968, Durks retired from sideshow performance and settled in Gibsonton, Florida. He died there on May 7, 1975, at the age of 62.

In 2024, 49 years after his death, Durks was inducted into the Coney Island Sideshow Hall of Fame.
