= Strates Shows =

American traveling carnival company

Strates Shows, Inc.
- Type: Privately held company
- Industry: Amusement - Midway
- Founded: 1923
- Headquarters: Orlando, Florida
- Key people: E. James Strates (CEO); James E. "Jimmy" Strates (President)
- Products: Amusement ride rental/operation and traveling carnival management
- Number of employees: 400+

Strates Shows, Inc. is a family operated traveling carnival midway company based in Orlando, Florida. It provides amusement rides, games and concessions for local, county and state fairs throughout the United States. Strates Shows was the last midway company in the US that transported personnel and equipment by train during its annual seven-month season. The train consisted of 61 rail cars and 34 truck, until 2019 when the show began to only operate by trucking. Rail transportation returned once again in 2024 to commemorate the 100 year partnership with the Erie County Fair. The train has now been retired as of August 2024.

== History ==
James E. Strates, a Greek immigrant, came to the United States in 1909. He first worked a series of odd jobs, but in 1919, joined Lee Schaefer's Athletic Show as a professional wrestler under the name of "Young Strangler Lewis" after learning the sport at a YMCA in Endicott, New York. Strates, along with partners Nick Bozinis and W.L. Platt, would renovate the show and call it Southern Tier Shows in 1922. The first show consisted of a merry-go-round, ferris wheel, an athletic show, 15 concessions, three side shows and five hard rubber tire trucks. Times were hard that season, and Strates bought out his partners the following year. He also continued to wrestle and manage other performers as a side project.

In 1927, Strates purchased an old plant near Elmira, New York in order to help facilitate equipment maintenance. His show grew into 11 major acts, traveling the area on 18 trucks before the Great Depression struck in 1929. Southern Tier Shows struggled over the next few years like other businesses during the period, but many of Strates' creditors carried him through due to his honest reputation. In 1932, the name of the company would be changed to James E. Strates Shows. Beginning in 1934, Strates would purchase his first flatbed railroad cars to haul equipment, eventually operating 40 cars. He continued to buy smaller companies over the next few years to enlarge his business.

On December 22, 1945, fire engulfed a barn holding all of Strates' midway equipment which was being stored for the winter in Mullins, South Carolina. His train was the only usable piece remaining. Luckily, everything was insured. Strates was able to rebuild his company, bigger and better, in time for the 1946 season. By 1953, James E. Strates Shows was one of the largest midway companies in the United States. In 1955, the winter quarters moved to Orlando, Florida where it remains today.

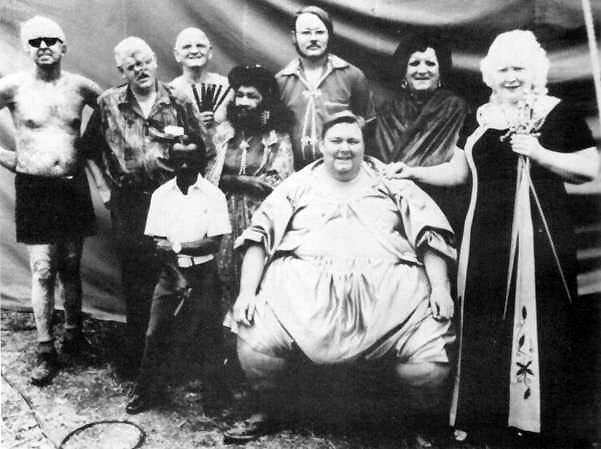
Sideshow performers of Strates Shows. Identifiable performers from left to right: Emmit Bejano, William Durks, Melvin Burthart, Percilla Bejano. On the far right is Sandra Reed, her hand resting on the shoulder of her husband, Harold “Big Jim” Spohn.

Throughout the mid 20th century, Strates Shows included traveling sideshows which exhibited “human oddities” and extreme feats such as sword-swallowing and human blockhead acts. Many were hired through the Slim Kelly and Whitney Sutton sideshow.

These performances included people such as Melvin Burkhart (human blockhead and magician), Percilla Bejano (“The Monkey Girl”), William Durks (“The Two-Face Man”), Jóhann Pétursson (“The Viking Giant”), “Lady” Sandra Reed (Guinness World Records sword swallower) and her husband Harold “Big Jim” Spohn (“the fat man”).

In 1958, Strates Show included a “Two-Ton-Hippopotamus”, and the “Wild Animal Menagerie”, involving elephants, camels, zebras, lions, bears and a brahma bull.

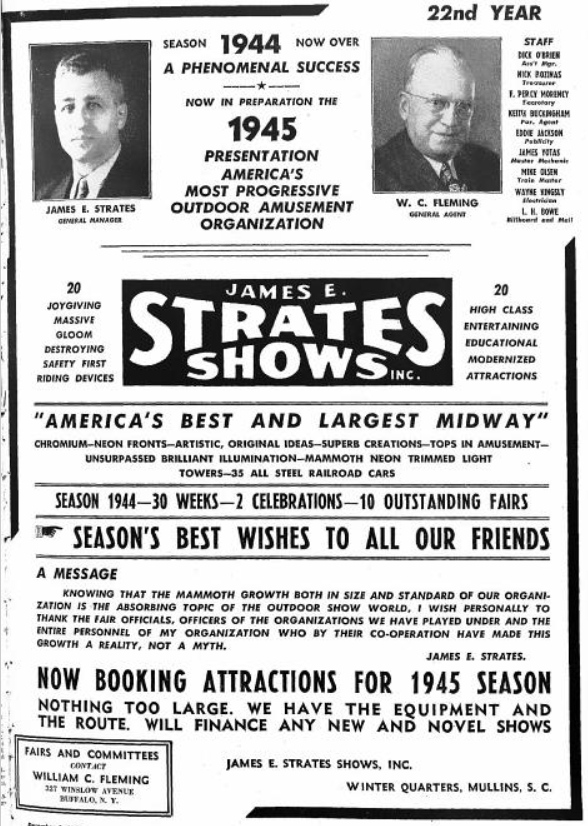
1944 advertisement for Strates Shows

After James E. Strates died in 1959, his son E. James Strates inherited the company. Now licensed under Strates Shows, Inc., the younger Strates continues to own and operate the business. Over the years, E. James Strates brought new innovations to the amusement industry including cooperative promotions, advance ticket sales and a centralized ticket system. Like other carnival midway companies, many of their rides have recently become eco-friendly including the use of LED lighting and biodiesel fueled generators.

The Erie County Fair, located in Hamburg, New York, is currently the oldest stop on the circuit. Strates Shows has operated the midway there since 1924, just after the company's inception. A few state fairs have been included on their route in the past, but Strates Shows has met significant bidding competition for providing midways at these venues in recent years. Despite these challenges, Strates Shows continues to keep a busy annual schedule. Other notable events the company currently works include the Georgia-Carolina State Fair in Augusta, Georgia, the Hudson Valley Fair in Wappingers Falls, New York, the Champlain Valley Fair in Essex Junction, Vermont, the North Florida Fair in Tallahassee, Florida and the Carolina Classic Fair in Winston-Salem, North Carolina.
