= Alex Zander Morrow =

Sideshow performer (born 1989)

Alex Tomaini
- Born: Scott Alexzander Tomaini; 1989 (age 36–37)
- Other names: Alex Zander Morrow; Junior Torture King
- Occupation: sideshow performer
- Known for: youngest US swordswallower
- Relatives: Al Tomaini (grandfather)

Alex Tomaini (stage name: Alex Zander Morrow) is a sideshow performer. At the age of 14, he officially became the youngest confirmed sword swallower in the United States. He swallowed his first sword at the 2003 Sword Swallowers Convention in Wilkes-Barre, Pennsylvania before an audience of his peers and international media, only four hours after swallowing his first coat hanger as practice. He later joined a record attempt called "The Big Swallow" in which a group of sword swallowers try to simultaneously swallow as many swords as possible.

Alex lost the record to Erik Kloeker of the Pickled Brothers Sideshow, who is one year younger than Alex.
