= Carnival Diablo =

Carnival Diablo the Ultimate Sideshow is a travelling sideshow operating primarily in Spencerville, Ontario, Canada. Performances by the troupe follow a traditional Ten-in-One format featuring such acts as fire-eating, sword swallowing and a human blockhead, with show times lasting two and a half hours. Carnival Diablo opened on April Fools' Day 1992 by Scott McClelland, whose family goes back three generations in the carnival and side show business. Shows have been performed across Canada, including shows at The Calgary Stampede, Edmonton's Klondike Days (now K-Days,) Regina's Buffalo Days, and the Canadian Tulip Festival. In 2008 and 2009, Carnival Diablo was a featured act at Carnivàle Lune Bleue, a dedicated revival of a 1930s old-time carnival located in Ottawa, Ontario.

== History ==
Scott McClelland's grandfather, Nicholas Paul Lewchuk, had run and operated Canada's largest travelling sideshow from 1920 through 1968. Starting as a performance show with acts ranging from sword swallowing to an on stage seance, Professor N. P. Lewchuk's Travelling Shows grew to include rides and live animals. Nicholas, whose fascination with magic led to the birth of the sideshow, performed many mental acts himself, with his wife Anastasia acting as the show sword swallower. Starting in 1968, Nicholas Lewchuk maintained the shows as a stationary attraction, until 1987.

Starting early in life, Scott began apprenticing under his grandfather at the age of 13. Scott produced a Vaudeville Show called, Prof. Crookshank's Travelling Medicine Show in 1978 and performed it yearly at the Calgary Stampede, Edmonton's Klondike Days and Regina's Buffalo Days until 1985. He then toured the show to theatres until 1991. Scott was involved with two of Canada's largest haunted attractions. The first, 'The Caine Manor' built in 1981, was where Scott learned the ropes under horror special effects artist Charles Porlier. The second, 'The Black Castle', was a two story horror attraction that featured a thirty-minute journey from beginning to end. It was at this time that Scott began producing a Magic Torture Show featuring black magic illusions such as the Guillotine and a flaming Sword Cabinet. In keeping with the horror theme, these shows were performed by Scott in full zombie costume and makeup.

With the development of a working stage act, Scott invented Carnival Diablo as the Ultimate Sideshow, and began touring Canada in 1992. The act featured special effects combined with real feats and performances. Performers in Carnival Diablo's history have included Strongmen, Grindergirls, Human Pincushions, Sword Swallowers and Bug Eaters. The success of Carnival Diablo has led to appearances on television as well as a cameo appearance by Scott McClelland in the film Wolf Girl.

In the summer of 2010, Carnival Diablo was featured in the "Historical Building" at the Ottawa SuperEx. They had a large exhibit that presented the history of Professor N. P. Lewchuk's Travelling Shows, an exhibit dedicated to "The Machines of Death," and their World of Wonders. Their exhibits placed 3rd overall for "Best Attraction." Scott also gave nightly lectures on the history of sideshow, as well as his experience as a showman.

== Today ==
In recent years, Carnival Diablo has evolved from a stage show embodying the look and feel of a 19th-century Victorian sideshow to a performance tinged with a more sinister and otherworldly subtext. Today, the Sideshow features various performers fulfilling the Ten-in-One act.

Nikolai Diablo Scott McClelland leads the show, performing a series of extreme stunts that include eating razor blades, drinking boiling water, piercing his tongue with a hook, and playing Russian roulette with a nine-inch construction spike.

Ophelia A young Gothic Lolita who dances on broken glass, and lies on a bed of nails, allowing a cinder block to be crushed on her chest.

Volos A demon from Hell who impales himself with needles sharpened to a deadly point, sets an animal leg-hold trap off with his own bare hand, and dines on crickets and worms.

== Attractions ==
Along with the sideshow performances that Carnival Diablo has become famous for, Scott McClelland has created several attractions that have been put on display at several venues, most notably at carnivals such as the Red River Ex, the Calgary Stampede and the Canadian National Exhibition.

Carnival Diablo - The Strangest Show Unearthed A Big Top Circus Tent Show that embodies the Mystery and Wonder of Carnival Diablo's Sordid World.

The World of Wonders Houses an assortment of strange and obscure objects, such as 'The Mummified Prospector', 'The Killer Dummy' and more.

Anastasia the Living Mermaid Hidden away under a carnival tent is a Living Mermaid ready to interact with anyone from within the confines of her tank of water.

The Missing Link The frozen remains of the missing link between Neanderthals and Homosapiens, complete with an archival documentary.

The Paranormal Show: Wunderkammer is a program featuring Scott McClelland, who explores topics related to the paranormal and supernatural. The title references a Wunderkammer, a term for a cabinet of curiosities that originated in 16th- and 17th-century Europe.
