= James Taylor (American author) =

American writer and sideshow historian

James Taylor at the Palace of Wonders (photo courtesy of James Taylor and Shocked and Amazed!)

James Taylor is an American writer, publisher, and sideshow historian. He co-founded Dolphin-Moon Press in 1973 and published books based on his American sideshow history magazine, both titled as volumes of Shocked and Amazed!, from 1997 to 2002.

== Early life and education ==
Taylor is a graduate of the University of Maryland, College Park and the Johns Hopkins Writing Seminars.

== Career ==
In the late 1980s and early 1990s, Taylor was literary chairman to the Baltimore mayor's advisory committee on art and culture and was a member of the Maryland governor's panel choosing the state's poet laureate.

In 1999, he co-founded, with Dick Horne, the American Dime Museum in Baltimore, a museum that was part Victorian recreation and part homage to circus, carnival and dime museum culture. Taylor dissolved his partnership with Horne in 2003 and began work on re-establishing his own museum attractions in Washington, D.C., inside of the Palace of Wonders, which opened in 2006.

Taylor has served as historical consultant to television productions in his capacity as variety arts historian.

He has three books of poetry and fiction to date: Tigerwolves, Tricks of Vision, and Artifacture. His Shocked and Amazed! - On & Off the Midway series, published through Dolphin-Moon since 1995, is the world's only journal devoted to novelty and variety exhibition and life in the sideshow; in 2002, Lyons/Globe Pequot Press published a “Best Of” Shocked and Amazed!

He has worked for the state government of Maryland since 1975.

For 25 years, beginning in 1984, he was an associate professor of English at the Dundalk, Maryland, campus of the Community College of Baltimore County.
