= Sandra Reed =

American sword swallower (1975–2019)

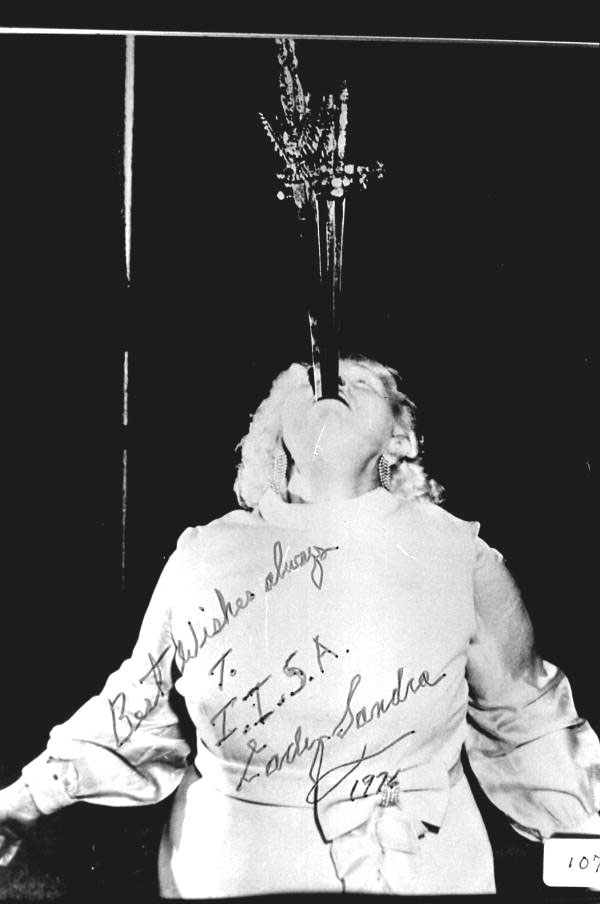
- Signed photo of Sandra Reed swallowing swords
- Born: Mary Armstrong; 1945; Hermon, New York
- Died: 2019 (aged 73–74)
- Other names: Lady Sandra; Queen of the Swords; The Albino Queen of the Swords
- Years active: 1960s—1980s
- Employers: Slim Kelly and Whitney Sutton Sideshow; James E. Strates Shows; Clyde Beatty Circus; Ringling Bros. and Barnum & Bailey Circus
- Spouse: Harold Spohn
- Honours: Guinness Book of World Records holder for swallowing 5 swords at once, female (1975–1977)

Sandra Dee Reed also known as Lady Sandra (1945–2019) was an American World Record holding sword swallower born with albinism. She started working for the Slim Kelly and Whitney Sutton sideshow of James E. Strates Shows at the age of 24 as a lecturer (educator on albinism) before being trained in sword swallowing and later performing in the Ringling Brothers and Barnum & Bailey Circus. From 1975 to 1977, she was a Guinness World Records holder for swallowing five 30-inch blades to two-thirds of their length simultaneously.

== Career ==
Reed was offered a job by showman Whitney Sutton at the New York State Fair in 1969, initially to be a lecturer on albinism. Her family was supportive—her sister Doreen, also albino, also joined as a lecturer, their father joined to sell tickets, and their mother previously worked in vaudeville and girl shows.

She learned sword swallowing from Ricky Richiardi in Gibsonton, Florida, in 1969.

In the mid-1970s she married and performed with Harold “Big Jim” Spohn, billed as “the fat man”.

From 1975 to 1977 she held the Guinness World Records title for most swords swallowed simultaneously by a woman.

An illustration of Reed swallowing swords was used for the cover art of volume one of James Taylor’s carnival history magazine Shocked and Amazed! for which she was interviewed in 1995.

The Shocked and Amazed! cover illustration was inspired by a photo of Lady Sandra taken by renowned American photographer Diane Arbus in 1970.

In 1991, this photo, titled "albino sword swallower at a carnival, Maryland" sold for $28,000 at auction.

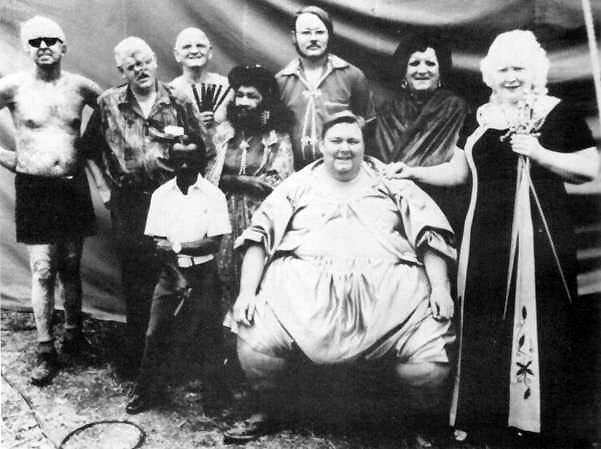
Sandra Reed (far right, hand on her husband Harold's shoulder) among other sideshow performers.
