= Mike Amoia =

American producer, entrepreneur, and investor

- Born: February 5, 1974 (age 52); Queens, New York
- Occupations: Producer, entrepreneur and investor

Michael “Mike” Amoia (born February 5, 1974) is a producer, entrepreneur and angel investor. He is currently the owner of MIBE Music & Indelible.

== Career ==
Amoia started out as a music producer at the young age of 22 and got his first freelance assistant editing job working nights at VH1 and Sony Studios loading tapes and prepping footage for the day shift. After one year, Amoia worked his way up to a freelance editor, working on various projects for MTV, VH1, Sony Studios, and Chappelle's Show on Comedy Central.

In 2003, Mike Amoia co-founded Vidiots – a 20,000 square foot postproduction facility in the West Village housing an agency representing editors and directors. Vidiots then expanded into a production company in 2010.

In 2015, Amoia created Mibe Music, a publishing company with over 40,000 music cues and songwriters worldwide, which he still co-owns with his operating partner. Mibe Music credits include Beyoncé Pepsi commercial, CBS sports, Bravo's Million Dollar Listing, History Channel's Counting Cars, and the NBA Finals opener for ESPN.

Amoia launched Switchblade Entertainment Group in 2016. Switchblade is a worldwide production company signed with Creative Artists Agency, and specializes in original, mostly unscripted content for TV, film, and digital. Production credits include Discovery Channel's "Dirty Money", CBS’ "Men of March”, “Worlds Tough Mudder”, Thursday Night football open, ESPN Monday Night Football open, Fox Being Liverpool, and Cooking Channel's "My Grandmothers Ravioli”.

Mike Amoia expanded his ventures into the health and wellness space in 2017 with his investment in Rumble Boxing, a group fitness gym founded in NYC. Just after being operational for little over a year Equinox picked up a significant minority stake in Rumble which was reported to be valued at about 100 million. Mike's investments have expanded to various sectors of business. He currently holds equity in over 17 companies including Rhone (men's activewear and accessories), Ramona (organic wine based spritzer), Stillhouse (liquor), and Van Leeuwen (vegan ice cream) to name a few.

In 2019 Amoia joined a New York-based film and media fund founded by Adi Cohen, Mark Damon and Jordi Rediu. He joined the $100 million private placement as a lead investor and head of DCR's decisions about buying into films and TV projects involving music and publishing rights.

On October 28, 2021, Mike was awarded the Guinness World Record for "the most insects tattooed on the body" with a total of 864 tattoos. His Guinness record was achieved to raise money and awareness for his non profit to help underprivileged kids. The previous record holder was the late Rick Genest aka "Zombie Boy" who has 176 insect tattoos.

In 2022 Amoia signed a multi-year deal with Apax Capital Group's European Consortium headed by Yona Wiesenthal and Noam Baram to provide full music coverage for films and TV shows made through Apax for 10 million Euros a year for the next 10 years. Amoia realized this commitment through his MIBE Music company. MIke will steer the Music Investment Committee of Apax's board and thus will be an active member in determining Apax's investment policies for film and television music and publishing rights.

June 2022 Forbes announced the launch of Mike Amoia's new NFT company called "Indelible". Indelible is bringing tattoo culture to web 3. It's the first project to help NFT owners monetize their IP rights by adding tattoos to their NFT characters.

In July 2025 Mike Amoia visited the James T. Vaughn Correctional Center in Smyrna, Delaware, becoming the first person from outside the prison to legally receive a tattoo inside the maximum-security correctional facility. During the visit, legendary tattoo artist B.J. Betts tattooed a scorpion on the palm of Amoia's hand in front of a group of inmates. As highlighted in Inked Magazine's feature, Tattooing for a Second Chance, this prisons program is helping incarcerated artists develop real-world skills, build confidence, and envision a future beyond prison walls.

== Awards ==
Emmy Awards

- 2004 (outstanding technical team) NBC
- 2007 (outstanding edited sports special) HBO
- 2007 (outstanding edited sports special) HBO
- 2007 (outstanding edited sports special) HBO
- 2008 (outstanding edited sports special) HBO
- 2008 (outstanding edited sports special) HBO
- 2011 (outstanding editing) HBO
- 2012 (outstanding live event turnaround) NBC

== Filmography ==
=== Music Executive ===
- Beyonce "The Mrs. Carter" promo (2013)
- ESPN "NBA Finals" (2016)
- Tru TV "Impractical Jokers" (2018)
- TLC "Return To Amish" (2018)
- History Channel "American Restoration" (2018)
- TLC "Say Yes To The Dress" (2018)
- AMC "Comic Book Men" (2018)
- CNN "Pope: The Most Powerful Man in History" (2018)
- MTV "Catfish" (2018)
- Bravo "Southern Charm" (2019)
- Netflix "One In A Billion" (2019)
- Investigation Discovery "Homicide Hunter" (2019)
- Animal Planet "The Vet Life" (2019)
- MTV "Fear Factor" (2019)
- MTV "The Real World" (2019)
- AMC "Ride With Norman Reedus" (2019)
- WE "Hustle & Soul" (2019)
- "Asbury Park: Riot Redemption Rock 'N' Roll" documentary (2019)
- Bravo "Married To Medicine" (2019)
- CNBC "The Profit" (2019)
- “The Last Full Measure” trailer (2020)
- CBS "Super Bowl" features and teases (2020)
- NBC "Olympics" (2020)
- Paramount Network "Ink Master" (2020)
- CBS News "America Decides" Theme (2020)
- Discovery "Unseamly Peter Nygard" (2020)
- NBC "Deal or No Deal" (2020)
- Paramount Network "I Am Patrick Swayze" (2020)
- VH1 "Love & Hip Hop" (2021)
- VH1 "Black Ink Crew" (2021)
- History Channel "Pawn Stars" (2021)
- History Channel "Counting Cars" (2021)
- Bravo "The Real Housewives of New Jersey" (2021)
- Bravo "Million Dollar Listing" (2021)

=== Executive producer ===
- Discovery Channel “Dirty Money” (2011)
- Discovery Channel “Hell Roads” (2012)
- Fox “Being: Liverpool” (2012)
- CBS "Moments of NCAA March Madness" (2014)
- HLN “Growing America: A Journey to Success” (2014)
- CBS "NCAA Men of March" (2014-2015)
- Food Network “My Grandmother’s Ravioli” (2015)
- CBS “World’s Toughest Mudder” (2016)
- FYI "Hero House" (2016)
- Reelz "Illustrated Man" (2016)
- HGTV "How Close Can I Beach" (2018)

=== Director ===
- ABC "College Football Open featuring OK Go" (2006)
- ABC "College Football Open featuring 50 Cent, Perry Farrell and Kelly Rolland" (2007)
- ESPN "Monday Night Football Open featuring Hank Williams Jr" (2011)
- GEICO "Super Bowl commercial" (2017)
- CBS "Thursday Night Football open featuring Don Cheadle" (2017)

=== Editor ===
- ESPN "Monday Night Football"
- CBS “The NFL Today”,
- Comedy Central "Chappelle's Show” (2003)
- MTV "Cribs”
- VH1 "I Love the ‘70s” (2003)
- ESPN "The NBA Finals" (2005)
- ABC "Super Bowl XL" (2006)
- CBS "The 33rd Annual Daytime Emmy Awards" (2006)
