= Jeanie Tomaini =

American sideshow performer

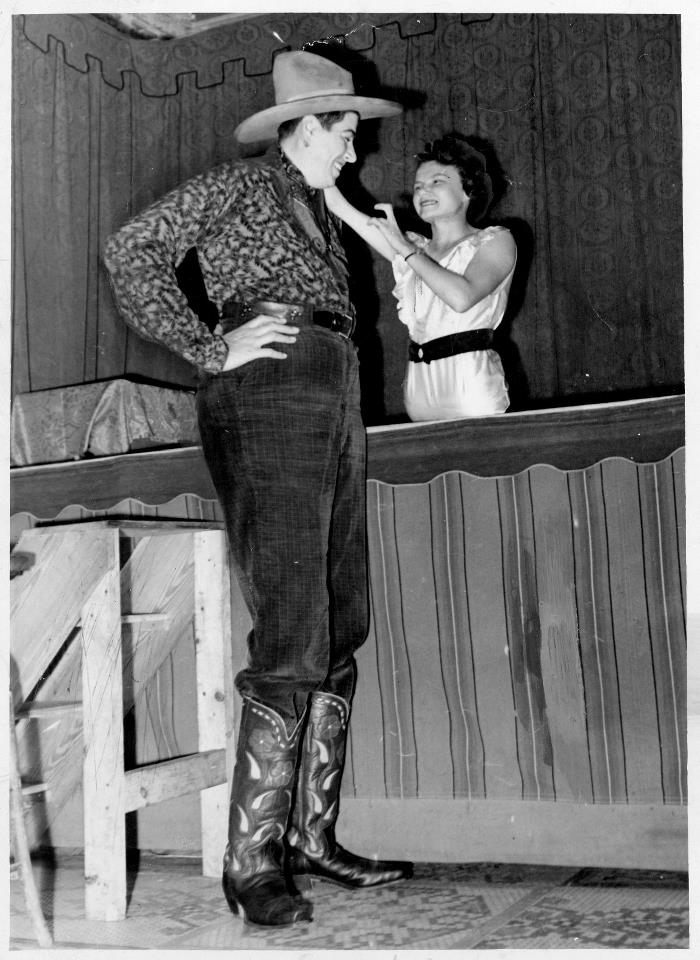
- Jeanie Tomaini and her husband Al.
- Born: Berniece Evelyn Smith; August 23, 1916; Blufton, Indiana, US
- Died: August 10, 1999 (age 83); Gibsonton, Florida, US
- Known for: Performing as "The World's Only Living Half-Girl" or "The Half-Girl"
- Height: 0.74 m (2 ft 5 in)
- Spouse: Al Tomaini (m. 1936–1962)
- Children: 2 adopted daughters

Bernice Evelyn "Jeanie" Smith Tomaini (Blufton, Indiana, August 23, 1916 – August 10, 1999, Gibsonton, Florida) was an American sideshow performer billed as "The World's Only Living Half-Girl" or "The Acrobatic Half-Girl". She was born without legs, due to sacral agenesis or phocomelia, and stood 2 ft 5 in tall (0.74 meters). Her family started putting her on exhibit when she was as young as three years old.

== Career ==
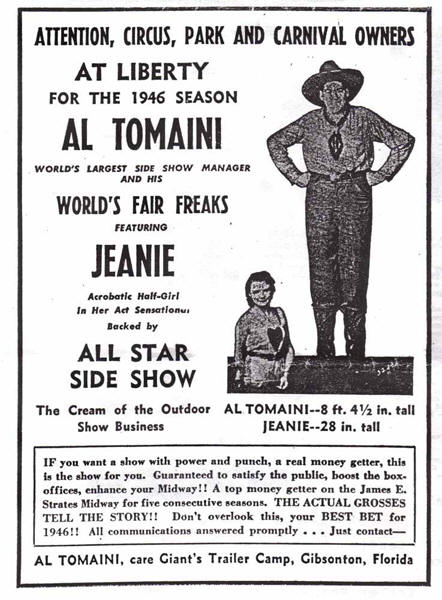
Flyer by Al and Jeanie, advertising them as available for hire for the 1946 fair season.

Jeanie and her husband Al Tomaini ("Al the Giant", once the world's tallest person at 7 ft 4 in, or 2.24 meters) performed together as a "World's Strangest Married Couple" duo, like many other married couples of the traveling sideshow.

On television, she was featured in a 1992 episode of the British show The Secret Cabaret and an E! True Hollywood Story episode titled "The Murder of Lobster Boy".

She was interviewed for the 1999 documentary film Sideshow: Alive on the Inside.
