= Rick Genest =

Canadian actor, model and musician (1985–2018)

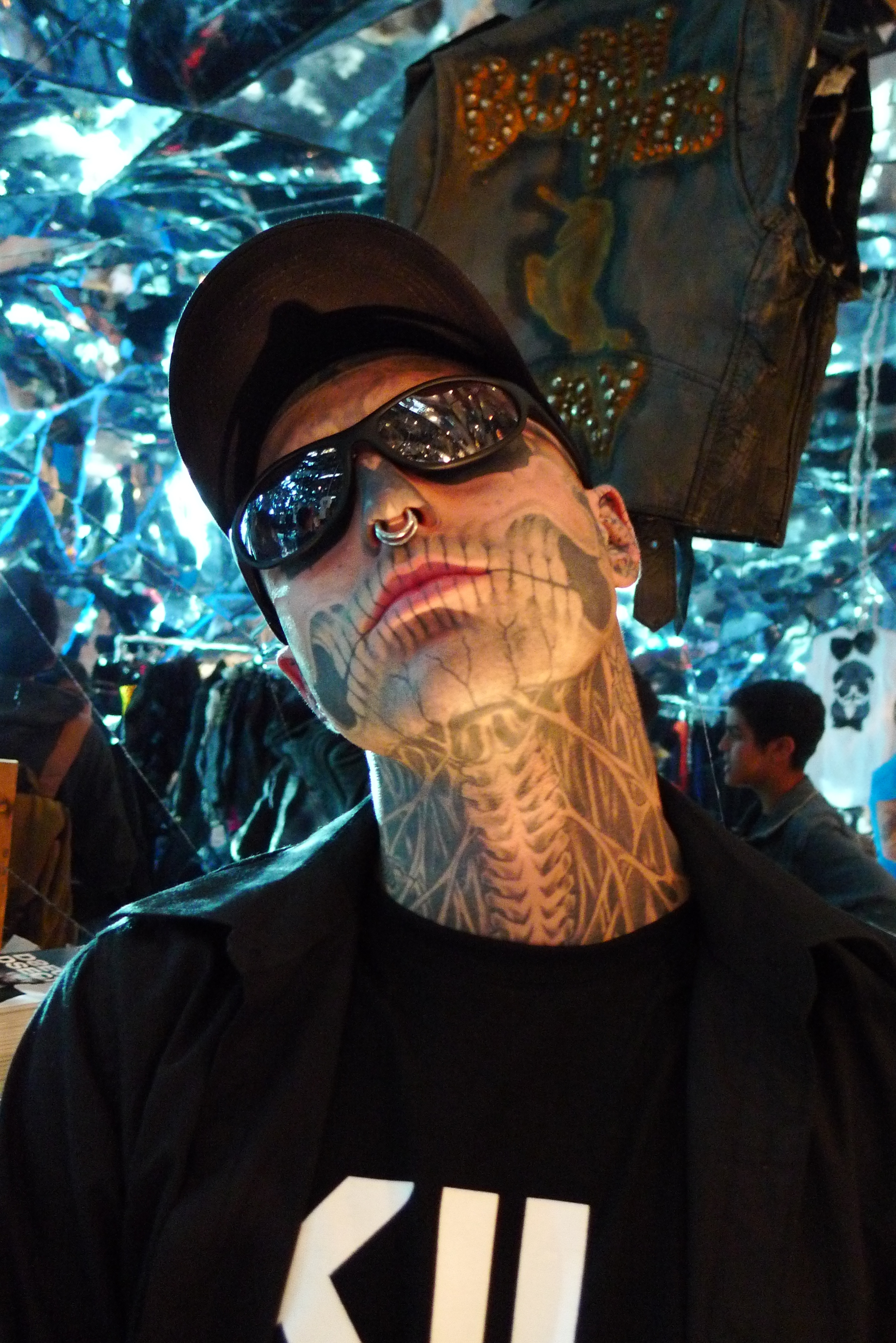
- Genest in 2011
- Born: August 7, 1985; LaSalle, Quebec, Canada
- Died: August 1, 2018 (aged 32); Montreal, Quebec, Canada
- Other names: Zombie Boy; Rico the Zombie
- Occupations: Actor, freak show performer, fashion model
- Years active: 2009–2018

Rick Genest (August 7, 1985 – August 1, 2018), also known as Zombie Boy, was a Canadian artist, actor, fashion model, and musician. He held a Guinness World Record for his full-body tattoos.

== Personal life ==
Genest was born in LaSalle, Quebec, and grew up in Châteauguay. At 14, Genest was told he had a brain tumor. After more examinations and tests, six months later, he had a laser procedure, claiming he was the second North American to survive the laser treatment.

Genest had himself tattooed over approximately 90% of his body and held the Guinness World Record for the most tattoos of human bones (139). He previously held the Guinness World Record for most tattoos of insects (176), until November 2018, when Joshua Thornton took the title.

== Career ==
Tattooed as a living skeleton, Genest worked in various sideshows and freak shows across Canada as an illustrated man, eventually starring in his own show, called Lucifer’s Blasphemous Mad Macabre Torture Carnival. Not long after beginning his facial tattoos, Genest was first introduced to the public on November 13, 2006, in a blog post on Body Modification Ezine (BME)'s ModBlog. In March 2008 he had his first interview, by which time his tattoos were largely completed. In this interview, Genest clarified that he preferred the moniker "Zombie" to "Skullboy", as BME had been referring to him.

The introductions on RzyM's Channel led to increasingly mainstream media coverage, notably a June 2008 feature in Bizarre magazine. In the 2009 television film Carny, starring Lou Diamond Phillips as a small-town sheriff, Genest was seen as a Tattooed Man at the Carnival. In the summer of 2010, he was discovered by artist Marc Quinn, in Bromont, Quebec, where Genest was working with the sideshow, Alive on the Inside, at Carnivàle Lune Bleue.

=== As a model ===
In January 2011, Genest was featured in the new Thierry Mugler Autumn/Winter men's collection, headlining it on the brand's website, after his discovery by Formichetti, who was Mugler's creative director. It was Genest's involvement, and Lady Gaga's urging, which resulted in the menswear show, something not originally planned. His involvement also influenced Formichetti on the collection itself. The show was accompanied by a video featuring Genest, shot by fashion photographer Mariano Vivanco. He later featured alongside Lady Gaga in the fashion show for the women's 2011 Autumn/Winter line.

In February 2011, Genest was featured in Lady Gaga's music video for "Born This Way", with Lady Gaga wearing makeup to replicate Genest's tattoos. Genest was featured in the sixth volume of Vogue Hommes Japan, in an editorial titled "Hard To Be Passive". In the Summer issue of GQ Style (UK), Formichetti and Genest are interviewed, with Genest shot in Mugler by Karim Sadli for the editorial.

In late 2011, Genest was featured in a campaign entitled "Go Beyond the Cover", promoting Dermablend professional makeup products, appearing in a video where a makeup team covered all the tattoos on his head, torso, arms, and part of his back in its concealer product. The advert then shows him sitting with the phrase "How do you judge a book?". He then proceeds to remove portions of the makeup, starting with a section of his chest to reveal the tattoo underneath, continuing to his face.

The video then showed the process of applying the cover-up played backwards. The commercial success of this campaign led to a 2-year endorsement contract with L'Oréal for Genest, who became its first-ever male spokesperson. Genest appeared in the music video of the Polish pop singer Honey. The video for her song "Sabotage" was released in January 2012.

For the 2012 San Diego Comic-Con, the Tonner Doll Company produced "Zombie Boy", a limited edition character figure in Genest's likeness. He was Tonner's guest at the convention. Included with each doll is a certificate of authenticity signed by Genest, as "Rico the Zombie". The edition was limited to 500 dolls, all of which were sold as of July 27, 2012.

In September 2012, Genest became the face of the Jay-Z music fashion label Roc-A-Wear for its re-launch in Europe.

In May 2014, images of Genest, taken by Colin Singer, were exhibited in the Paris-based Musée du quai Branly, Exhibition "Tattoists, Tattooed".

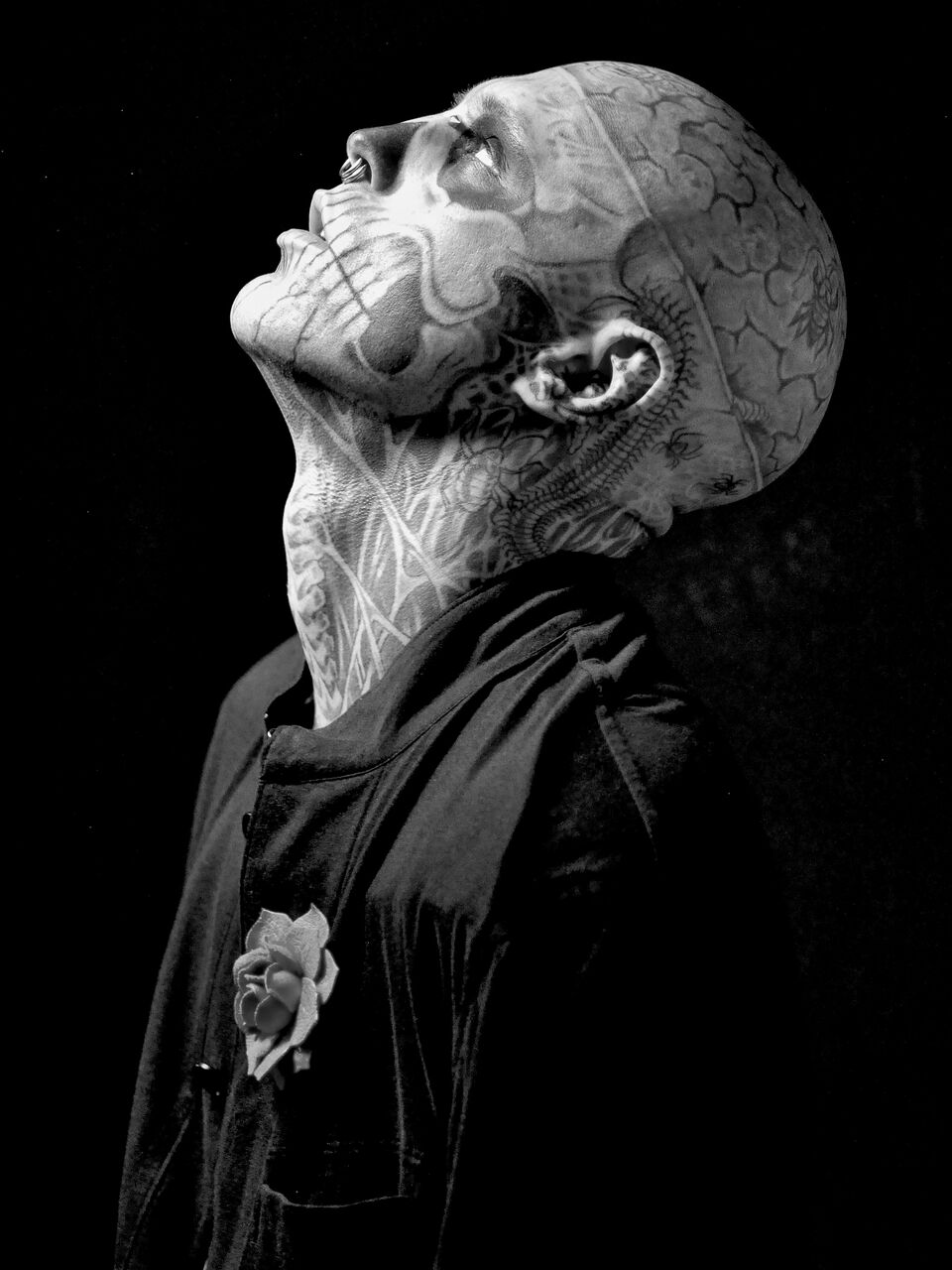
Zombie Boy (Photo by Colin Singer)

=== As an actor and musician ===
He was cast as the character "Foreman" in the 2013 film 47 Ronin, featuring Keanu Reeves. Genest was prominently featured in early promotional material for the film, but his role was mostly edited out of the final version of the film after it went through several re-writes and other changes.

Genest collaborated with British solo artist KAV on the single "Dirty Rejects", released in May 2013. They spent the first part of 2013 recording an album project, and a video titled "Monsters Versus the World" in Los Angeles. The project was discontinued.

As of January 2015, Genest was working with guitarist Mike Riggs on an upcoming album. On the horror news site Bloody Disgusting, a "Zombie Boy 666 Medley" video was released featuring samples of six songs to be on the upcoming album.

In June 2017, as part of the TEDx #DISRUPTyou, Genest released a video titled "Normal is an illusion", which recounted his experiences with a brain tumour, among other things.

Unveiled in 2019, an 11.5-foot (3.5 m) sculpture of Genest, called "Self-Conscious Gene", is a new permanent fixture at the Science Museum, London, UK. The statue was created by British artist Marc Quinn.

== Death ==
On August 1, 2018, Genest was found dead after a fall from the third floor balcony at a close friend's apartment, in the Le Plateau-Mont-Royal district of Montreal. A police source initially told CBC News that the death was likely a suicide. In October 2019, coroner Melissa Gagnon ruled that the death was accidental. Her investigation concluded that Genest died from head trauma after landing on the sidewalk and noted a high level of alcohol in his system with traces of cannabis, with no "unequivocal" evidence of suicidal intent.

He left no suicide note, had recently become engaged, and by all accounts found his career fulfilling. Some relatives and friends believed all along it had been an accident. His manager, of a similar height to Genest (5'10"), noted the balcony railing ends below his hips. He speculated that Genest lost his balance and fell, explaining Genest often leaned against or sat on railings while smoking.

== In popular culture ==
- In 2025, Lady Gaga released the song "Zombieboy" in tribute to Genest.

== Filmography ==
Year	Title	Role	Notes
2009	Carny	Carny	
2013	Aquario	Zombie Boy	Short
2013	47 Ronin	Foreman	A larger role was initially developed
2013	In Faustian Fashion	Phoenix	Also executive producer; Short
2014	Love at Last Sight	Zombie Boy	Official Selection Montreal World Film Festival; Short
2017	Silent Witness	El Buitre	BBC One TV Series; Series 20, Episode: Awakening Part 1 & Part 2

== Music ==
Year	Album	Song
TBA	TBA	"That Terrible Song"
TBA	TBA	"Monster Inside"
TBA	TBA	"Monster Man"
TBA	TBA	"Yeah Bebe Yeah"
TBA	TBA	"Darkness Falls"
TBA	TBA	"Bad to the Bone"
