= Galyon =

Galyon is a surname. Notable people with the surname include:

- Nicolle Galyon (born 1984), American country music singer, songwriter, and record producer
- Ronnie and Donnie Galyon (1951–2020), American conjoined twins
- Scott Galyon (born 1974), American football player
