= Bed of nails =

Large piece of wood with nails pointing upwards from it

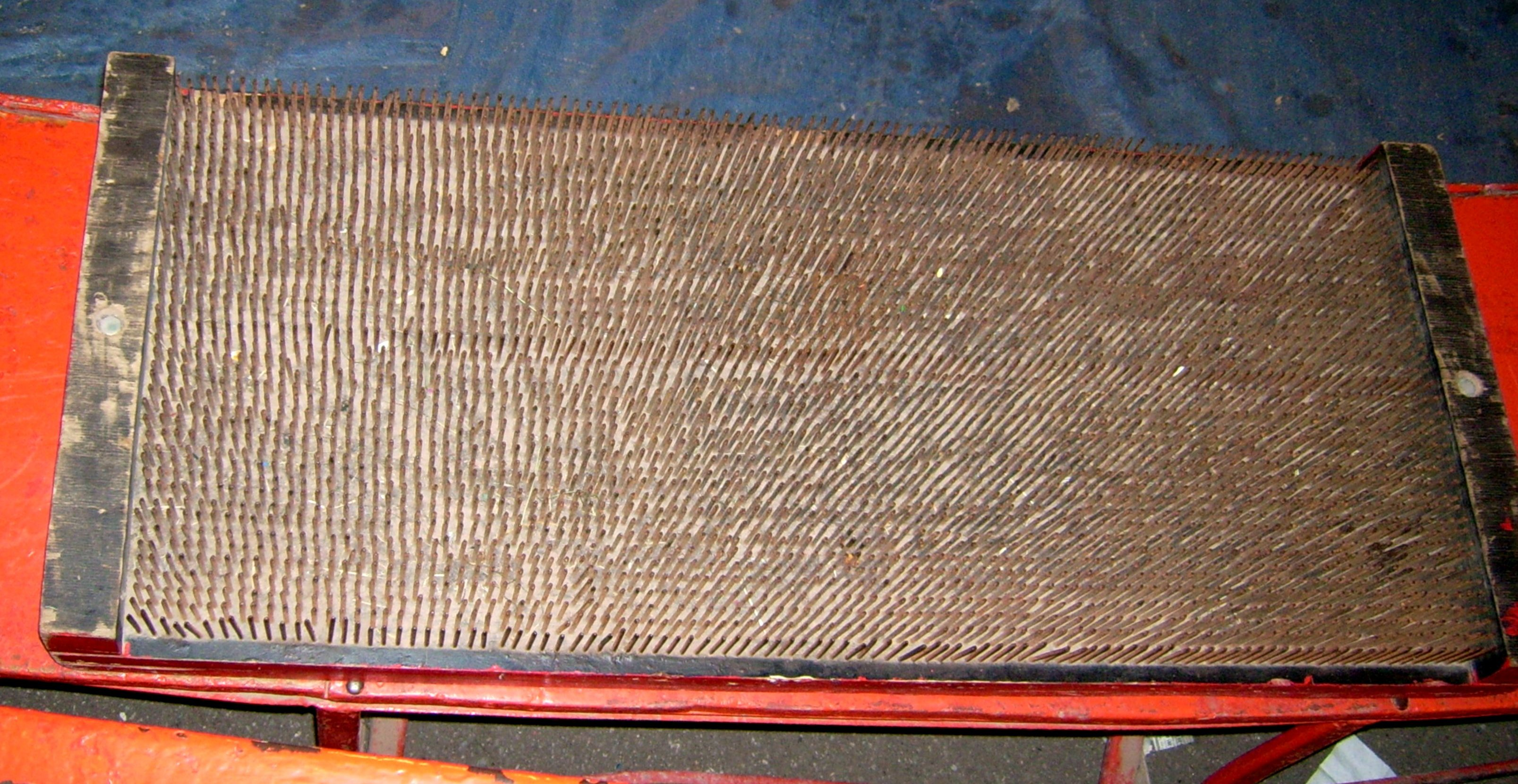
A bed of nails

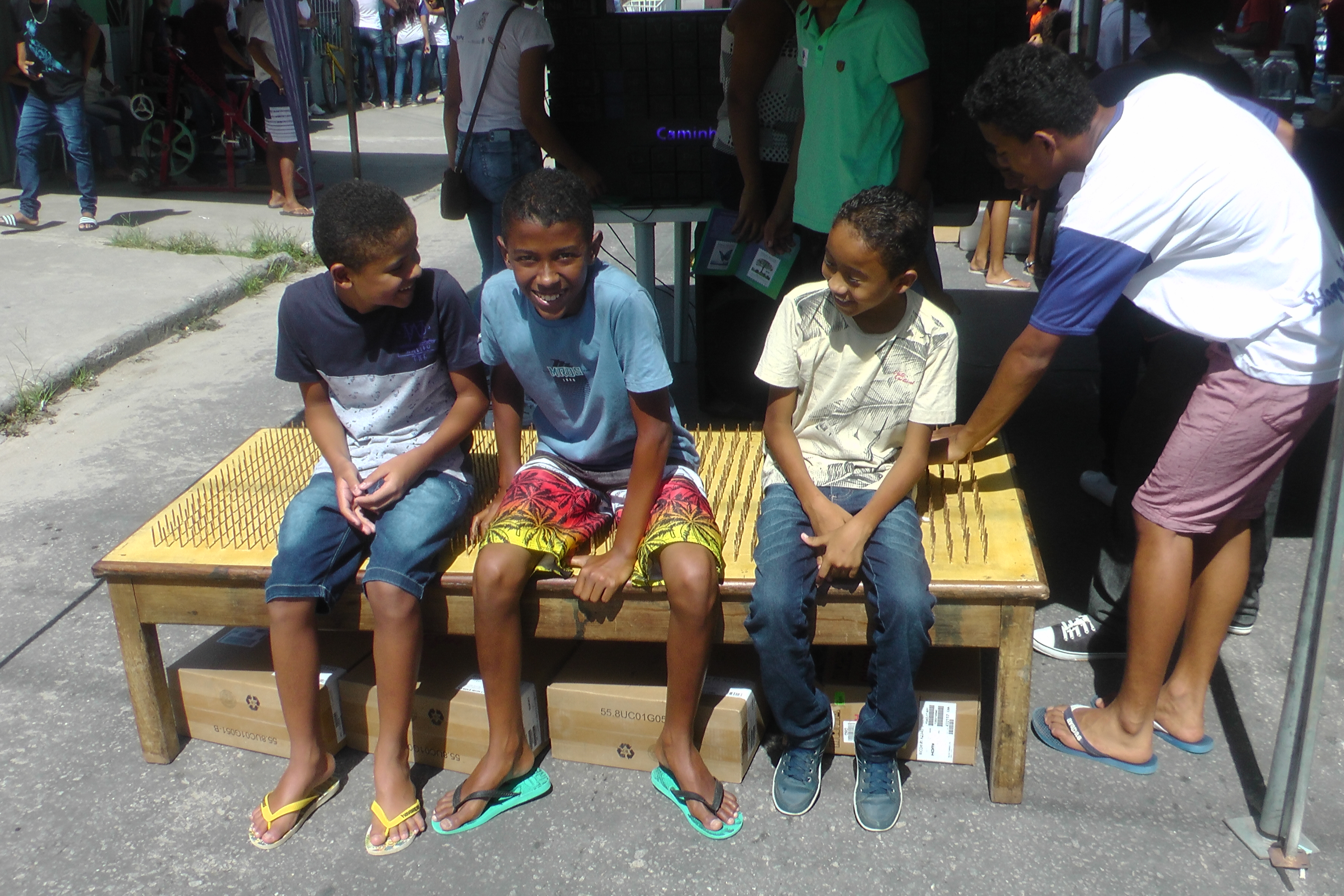
Children on a bed of nails used for science popularization in Brazil

A bed of nails is an oblong piece of wood, the size of a bed, with nails pointing upwards out of it. While it appears at first glance that anyone lying on such a "bed" would be injured by the nails, if the nails are numerous enough, the weight is distributed among them so that the pressure exerted by each nail is not enough to puncture the person's skin.

== Uses ==
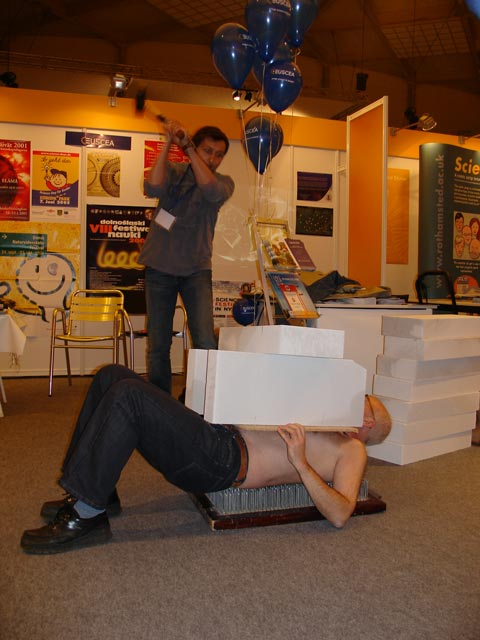
Magic trick with smashing cinder blocks placed on a "fakir"

One use of such a device is for magic tricks or physics demonstrations. For example, the bed of nails was used in vaudeville in the United States, as well as in sideshows of circuses and carnivals. A famous example requires a volunteer to lie on a bed of several thousand nails, with a board on top of him. Cinder blocks are placed on the board and then smashed with a sledgehammer. Despite the seemingly unavoidable force, the volunteer is not harmed: the force from the blow is spread among the thousands of nails, resulting in reduced pressure; the breaking of the blocks also dissipates much of the energy from the hammer. This demonstration of the principles of weight distribution requires that the weight of the volunteer be spread over as many nails as possible. The most dangerous part is the moment of lying down or getting up, when one's weight may briefly be supported on only a few nails. Some "beds" have rails mounted at the sides to help users lie down and get up safely.

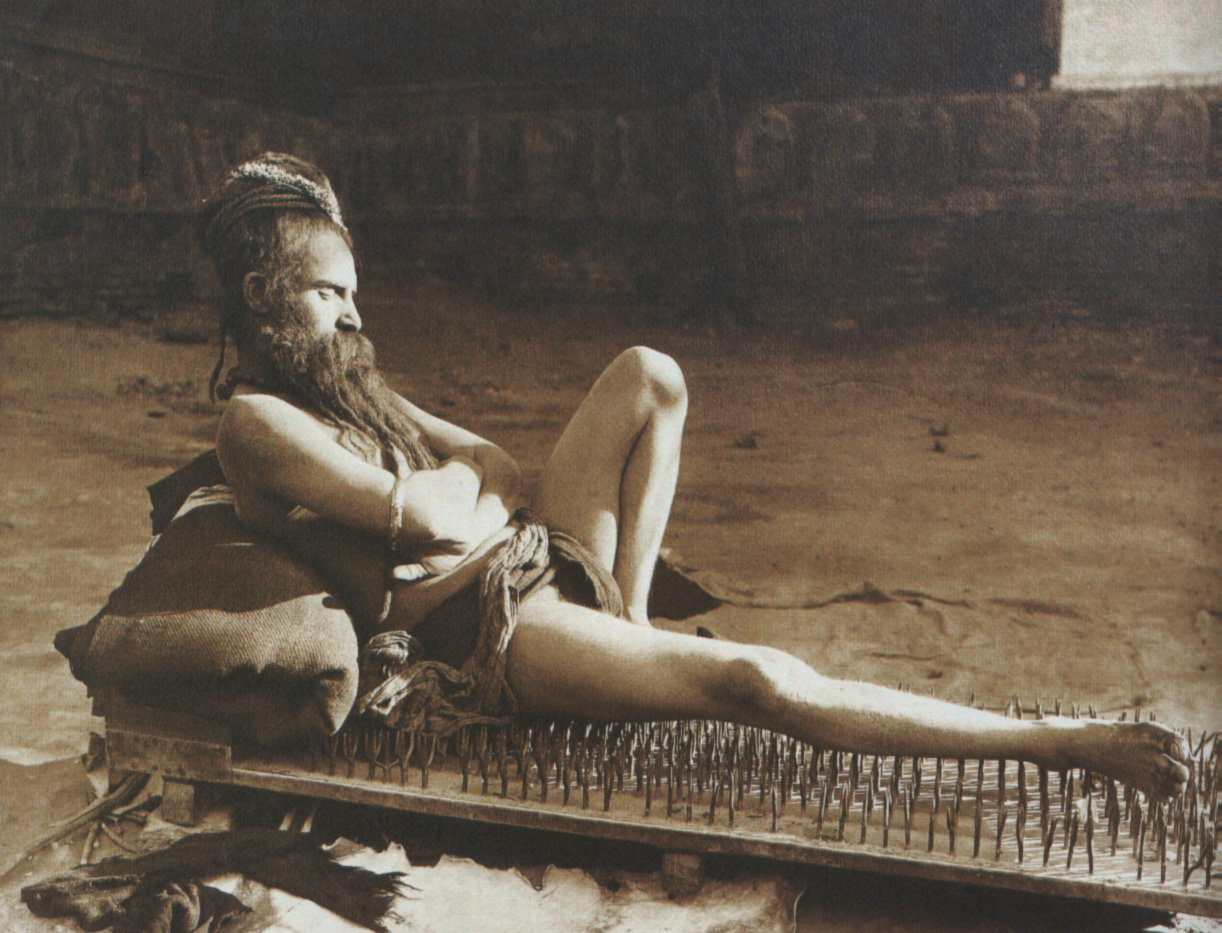
Herbert Ponting's 1907 photograph of "a fakir in Benares" (Varanasi, India)

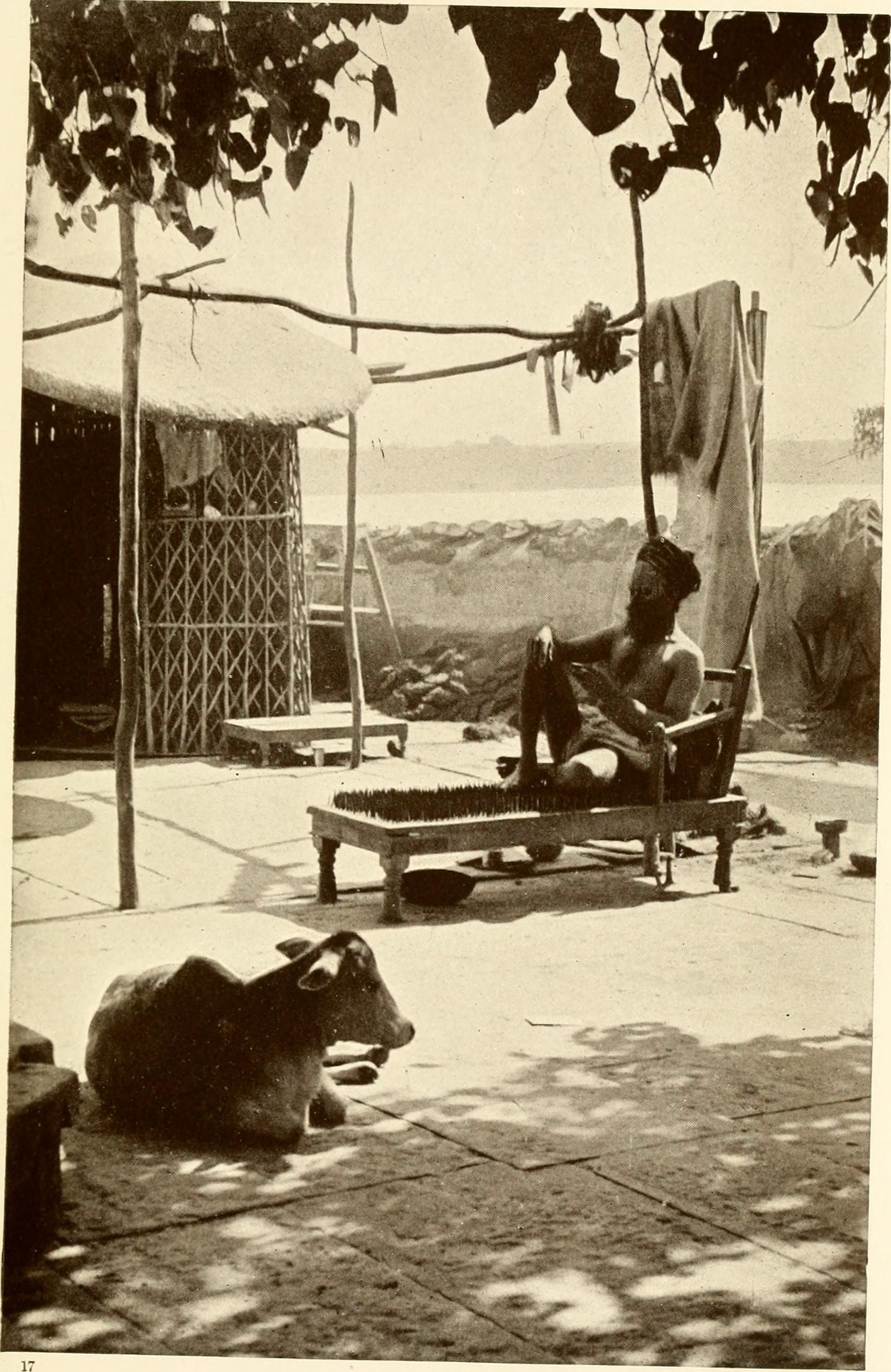
A Hindu yogi on a bed of spikes, 1913

Less traditional settings, such as science centers, may use an electronic retractable bed of nails, where the user lies on a flat plastic bed with holes in it, and can then activate the machine to have nails rise up all at once. The nails should retract before getting off the bed. This retraction eliminates the most dangerous part of a traditional bed of nails, getting on and off the bed.

== See also ==
- Firewalking
