= Adamsville, Hillsborough County, Florida =

- Unincorporated community
- Location within the state of Florida Adamsville (the United States)
- Coordinates: 27°48′53″N 82°23′2″W
- Country: United States
- State: Florida
- County: Hillsborough
- Time zone: UTC-5 (Eastern (EST))
  - Summer (DST): UTC-4 (EDT)
- ZIP codes: 33534
- Area code: 813
- GNIS feature ID: 277687

Adamsville is a rural, unincorporated community in southeastern Hillsborough County, Florida. It is a part of the census-designated place of Gibsonton.

== Education ==
The community of Adamsville is served by Hillsborough County Schools, which serves the entire county.
