= Melvin Burkhart =

American sideshow performer

- Born: Clarence Melvin Burkhart; February 16, 1907; Atlanta, Georgia
- Died: November 8, 2001 (aged 94); Sun City, Florida

Clarence Melvin Burkhart (1907–2001) was a sideshow performer known as the Human Blockhead for driving a large steel spike up his nose with a hammer. He was also known as Melvin the Two-Faced Man, due to his ability to wear different facial expressions on the two sides of his face, and as Melvin the Anatomical Wonder for his abilities as a contortionist. His act also included magic, sword swallowing, fire eating, and an electric chair.

== Biography ==
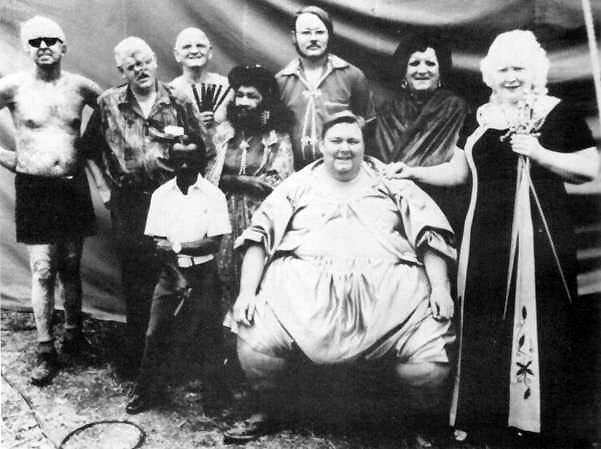
Sideshow performers of Strates Shows, with Melvin Burkhart pictured (back row, third from left, holding his swallowing swords).

Clarence Melvin Burkhart was born in Atlanta on February 16, 1907, and grew up in several places throughout the southern US, principally New Orleans. He dropped out of school in his early teens and moved to Louisville, Kentucky where he worked as a field hand by day and in burlesque halls by night.

At the age of 20, he joined a small one-ring circus, Mr. Leroy Easter's Traveling Family Circus, as a contortionist. In 1934, he joined Ringling Bros. and Barnum & Bailey Circus performing five acts. In 1939, he went to New York to perform at Robert Ripley's Odditorium in New York City, before returning to work with Ringling Brothers. Later, he joined the James E. Strates Shows, emceeing the sideshow and providing the majority of acts. He stayed with Strates Shows for over 30 years before moving to Coney Island USA’s Sideshow by the Seashore where he finished his career.

Burkhart performed a variety of acts, including a human blockhead routine, magic tricks, an electric chair illusion, and a snake-wrestling show. He was also able to suck in his abdomen to an extreme degree, becoming known as the "Man Without a Stomach".

In 1999 he appeared in the American documentary film Sideshow: Alive on the Inside.

== Legacy ==
In 2007, Burkhart was inducted into the Coney Island Sideshow Hall of Fame.
