= Carnivàle Lune Bleue =

Canadian live entertainment event

Carnivàle Lune Bleue Logo.

Carnivàle Lune Bleue (French: [kaʁnival lyn blø]) is a live entertainment event in Ottawa, Canada. It was created by Executive Producer and Founder, Wayne Van De Graaff. Van De Graaff has stated that after watching the HBO series, Carnivàle, he was inspired to pursue his lifelong dream and recreate a vintage Depression-era carnival.

Carnivàle Lune Bleue made its world debut in Ottawa, Ontario, Canada, on July 31, 2008 (special media sneak preview night) and officially opened to the public for an initial month-long run on August 1, 2008. In 2009, Carnivàle Lune Bleue performed from July 23 to August 30 at Hog's Back Park in Ottawa, Ontario, Canada. The opening weekend of the 2009 performance featured a special appearance by Adrienne Barbeau, who played Ruthie the Snake Dancer in Carnivàle.

Carnivàle Lune Bleue has been described as 'offering a visceral peek into the life of a Depression-era road show.'

== Creation ==
Carnivàle Lune Bleue is the creation of Wayne Van De Graaff, a former international tax and human resources expert who wanted to pay homage to and resurrect the Depression-era traveling carnivals he recalled hearing about from his grandparents while growing up in Utah.

During the development of Carnivàle Lune Bleue, Van De Graaff recruited an international team of circus and carnival advisors: Johnny Meah, who is popularly known as "The Czar of Bizarre," is famous for his work as a carnival advisor and historical consultant for the HBO show, Carnivàle." Claude Le Belle, who was one of Cirque du Soleil's first "Tent Masters" and now owns his own company. Jan-Rok Achard, an internationally renowned circus historian instrumental in founding the National Circus School in Montreal. Gilles Renaud, who worked with the Montreal International Jazz Festival and other entertainment ventures. Holde Unverzagt, who painted numerous show fronts and banners for amusement parks and carnivals. Jim Conklin of Conklin Show's, the largest amusement show provider in Canada since the 1920s to create a lifelike and authentic old-fashioned carnival experience.

== Attractions ==
The front gates of Carnivàle Lune Bleue.

The 2008 and 2009 Carnivàle Lune Bleue lineups featured the following main attractions:

=== Big Top main event ft. Cirque Maroc ===
The main event is the Cirque Maroc performance in the Vintage Big Top canvas tent. This show features internationally trained circus artists and former Cirque du Soleil trained performers in a 70-minute showcase of acrobatics, trapeze, contortionism, juggling, aerial rope and other such feats inspired by Depression-era circus, cabaret, burlesque and vaudeville shows. The Big Top used for the Cirque Maroc performance is in itself a piece of circus history in that it was the first tent ever used by Cirque du Soleil.

Cirque Maroc is produced specifically for Carnivàle Lune Bleue by Production Éclats de Rire (Artistic Directors and Administrators: Nicolette Hazewinkel & Rodrigue Tremblay; Production Manager: Gilles Renaud; Director: Pierre Potvin).

=== Ten-in-One Freak Show ft. Carnival Diablo ===
An homage to the freak shows of the original traveling circuses, the Ten-in-One show features acts such as fire-eating, sword swallowing, and the human dartboard. The freak show also involves a guillotine and an electric chair.

The Ten-in-One show is produced for Carnivàle Lune Bleue by Scott McClelland of Carnival Diablo (a successful Canadian touring freak show). McClelland has deep roots in the industry and enthusiastically signed on to perform his show in the old-style carnival revival, as his grandfather was involved with the largest traveling circus sideshow in Canada from 1920 to 1968. The show features McClelland himself as "Nikolai Diablo", Sword Swallower Extraordinaire; István Betyár, Countess Vanessa and the Illustrated Strongman; The Mighty Leviticus.

=== Tropical Terrors: Great Snakes of the World ===
The Tropical Terrors: Great Snakes of the Word show features snakes and bugs from all over the world, including a giant rock python. There are also boa constrictors, anacondas, spiders, rattlers, and other types of pythons, all available in a space-controlled, interactive environment. The Tropical Terrors show is produced for Carnivàle Lune Bleue by Little Ray's Reptile Zoo (the largest reptile rescue group in Canada and a successful touring zoo across Eastern Ontario).

=== The Magical Midway ===
Carnivàle Lune Bleue also features original, restored carnival rides, including a 1938 Allan Herschell Company vintage carousel and a 1917 Eli Bridge No. 5 Ferris wheel. For safety reasons, seatbelts were installed and the original gasoline engine that ran the Ferris wheel has been replaced with an electric one. The Magical Midway also includes a clairvoyant caravan, a variety of carnival games of skill, a Banner Line (a large art exhibit of carnival banners), a Grab Joint and Candy Joint (with classic carnival drinks and candies), and a vintage 1920s high striker.

=== The Congress of Wonders Museum ===
The Congress of Wonders tented exhibit features numerous artifacts, images and displays from the golden age of traveling carnivals including a freaks photo gallery, the infamous Turtle Boy, a genuine bed of nails and the Jersey Devil. The Congress of Wonders Museum is presented by the North American Carnival Museum and Archives.
