= Shocked and Amazed! =

James Taylor's Shocked and Amazed! On & Off the Midway is both a book and nine-volume magazine of the same name by James Taylor, released from 1995 to 2007, which chronicle the history of sideshows, novelty acts, and variety exhibits of the 20th century, primarily of the United States. The book editions of the magazine issues were published by Dolphin Moon Press, also owned by Taylor.

Focusing on circus and carnival sideshows and 19th Century dime museum entertainment, the journal also followed the history and characters of vaudeville and burlesque, wax museums and world's fairs, roadside attractions and other forms of traveling novelty entertainment.

The journal features interviews with the business’ “golden age” performers as well as modern talent and has included original works by Teller (magician), John Strausbaugh and Frank DeFord..

Shocked and Amazed! was recognized in The Learning Channel, The History Channel, E!: Entertainment Television, Channel 4 in London, and the National Geographic Channel.

Shocked and Amazed! Volumes 1-9 were published by James Taylor's Dolphin-Moon Press, while a “Best Of” Shocked and Amazed! was published in 2002 by Lyons/Globe Pequot, co-crediting James Taylor and Kathleen Kotcher.
