= Gibsonton, Florida =

- Census-designated place
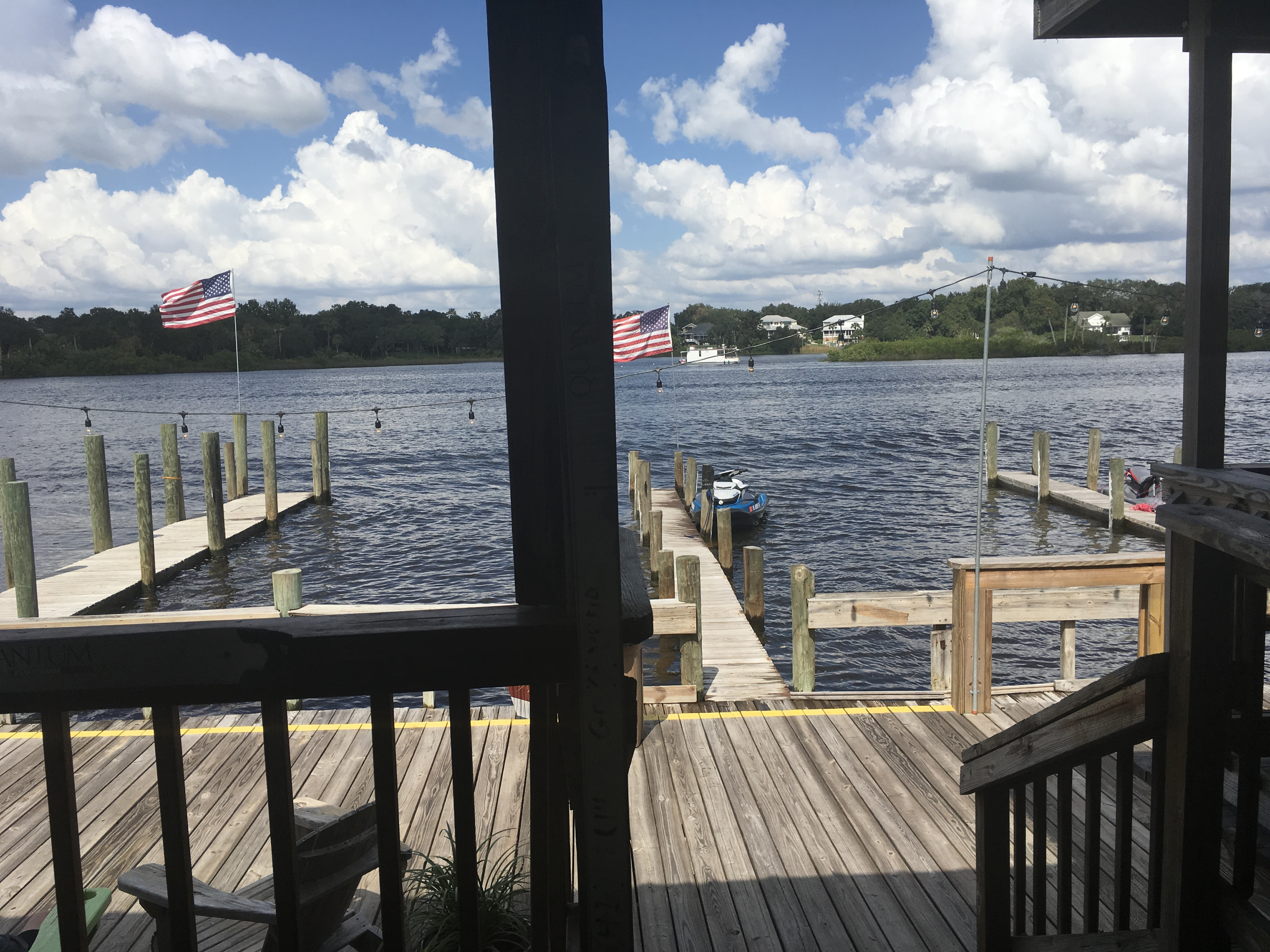
- View of a river in Gibsonton

- Location in Hillsborough County and the U.S. state of Florida
- Coordinates: 27°49′42″N 82°22′24″W
- Country: United States
- State: Florida
- County: Hillsborough

Area
  - Total: 15.44 sq mi (40.00 km^{2})
  - Land: 12.81 sq mi (33.19 km^{2})
  - Water: 2.63 sq mi (6.81 km^{2})
- Elevation: 10 ft (3.0 m)

Population (2020)
  - Total: 18,566
  - Density: 1,448.9/sq mi (559.42/km^{2})
- Time zone: UTC-5 (Eastern (EST))
  - Summer (DST): UTC-4 (EDT)
- ZIP code: 33534
- Area code: 813
- FIPS code: 12-25900
- GNIS feature ID: 2402524

Gibsonton, sometimes nicknamed Gibtown, is an unincorporated community and census-designated place in Hillsborough County, Florida, United States. U.S. Route 41 runs through the center of the community. The population was 18,566 at the 2020 census, up from 14,234 at the 2010 census.

Gibsonton was famous as a sideshow wintering town, where various people in the carnival and circus businesses would spend the off season, placing it near the winter home for the Ringling Brothers Circus at Tampa, Sarasota and Venice in various times. It was home to Percilla the Monkey Girl, the Anatomical Wonder, and the Lobster Boy. Siamese twin sisters ran a fruit stand here. At one time, it was the only post office with a counter for dwarfs. Aside from the agreeable winter climate, Gibsonton offered unique circus zoning laws that allowed residents to keep elephants and circus trailers on their front lawns.

Gibsonton was founded by James Gibson Sr., from Greenville, Alabama, in 1884. He homesteaded 150 acres at the mouth of the Alafia River, stretching to the east for approximately a half a mile along the south bank of the river. Gibson, along with Granville Platt and F.L. Henderson, became trustees of a school erected in 1888.

== Geography ==
Gibsonton is in south-central Hillsborough County. It is bordered to the north and the east by Riverview, to the south by Apollo Beach, and to the west by Hillsborough Bay. The unincorporated community of East Tampa is in the northern part of the CDP, north of the Alafia River, and Adamsville is in the southern part.

U.S. Route 41 runs through the center of Gibsonton, leading north 7 miles (11 km) to the east side of Tampa and south 30 miles (48 km) to Bradenton. Interstate 75 crosses the eastern part of Gibsonton, with access from Exits 246 and 250. I-75 leads north 6 miles (10 km) to the Brandon area and south 30 miles to Bradenton.

According to the United States Census Bureau, the Gibsonton CDP has an area of 15.4 square miles (40.0 km^{2}), of which 12.8 square miles (33.1 km^{2}) is land and 2.6 square miles (6.8 km^{2}), or 17.10%, is water.

== Demographics ==
Historical population
Census	Pop.	Note	%±
1990	7,706		—
2000	8,752		13.6%
2010	14,234		62.6%
2020	18,566		30.4%

=== 2020 census ===
As of the 2020 census, Gibsonton had a population of 18,566. The median age was 33.3 years. 28.4% of residents were under the age of 18 and 8.9% of residents were 65 years of age or older. For every 100 females there were 97.1 males, and for every 100 females age 18 and over there were 95.4 males age 18 and over.

98.8% of residents lived in urban areas, while 1.2% lived in rural areas.

There were 6,136 households in Gibsonton, of which 42.8% had children under the age of 18 living in them. Of all households, 46.4% were married-couple households, 16.7% were households with a male householder and no spouse or partner present, and 25.0% were households with a female householder and no spouse or partner present. About 17.3% of all households were made up of individuals and 5.0% had someone living alone who was 65 years of age or older.

There were 6,678 housing units, of which 8.1% were vacant. The homeowner vacancy rate was 2.2% and the rental vacancy rate was 9.0%.

Racial composition as of the 2020 census
Race	Number	Percent
White	8,422	45.4%
Black or African American	3,760	20.3%
American Indian and Alaska Native	110	0.6%
Asian	358	1.9%
Native Hawaiian and Other Pacific Islander	22	0.1%
Some other race	2,495	13.4%
Two or more races	3,399	18.3%
Hispanic or Latino (of any race)	6,717	36.2%

=== 2010 census ===
As of the census of 2010, there were 14,234 people living in the community. The racial makeup of the community was 72.80% White, 12.68% African American, 0.58% Native American, 1.78% Asian, 0.11% Pacific Islander, 8.96% from other races, and 3.09% from two or more races. Hispanic or Latino of any race were 27.88% of the population.

=== 2000 census ===
There were 3,112 households, out of which 36.7% had children under the age of 18 living with them, 47.9% were married couples living together, 14.4% had a female householder with no husband present, and 29.5% were non-families. 20.2% of all households were made up of individuals, and 6.5% had someone living alone who was 65 years of age or older. The average household size was 2.80 and the average family size was 3.18.

In the community the population was spread out, with 29.7% under the age of 18, 9.8% from 18 to 24, 30.7% from 25 to 44, 21.0% from 45 to 64, and 8.7% who were 65 years of age or older. The median age was 32 years. For every 100 females, there were 106.1 males. For every 100 females age 18 and over, there were 105.0 males.

The median income for a household in the community was $34,000, and the median income for a family was $36,067. Males had a median income of $27,457 versus $21,826 for females. The per capita income for the community was $15,695. About 16.0% of families and 18.3% of the population were below the poverty line, including 24.8% of those under age 18 and 11.7% of those age 65 or over.

== International Independent Showmen's Association and Museum ==
Gibsonton is the location of the International Independent Showmen's Association (Gibtown Showmen's Club), a non-profit private organization made up of people in the outdoor amusement industry. The original club building opened in 1966 and expanded to be the largest showmen's association in the United States. There are over 4,500 members from all over the United States and several foreign countries.

Gibsonton is also the home of the largest trade show in the carnival industry. Exhibits include rides, food supplies and equipment, concession trailers, electrical supplies, insurance companies, novelty items, plush toys, and jewelry.

Gibtown's International Independent Showmen's Museum houses on two floors a wide assortment of antique equipment, historic printed materials and detailed exhibits that tell the carnival story – most of it donated by practicing carnies. Carnival items from across the country reflecting nearly a century of carnival experiences have been donated.

The museum features photos of carnival setups throughout the years, with a particular focus on carnival transportation and the role that Gibsonton played in carnival history. The museum has one of the first Ferris wheels in the U.S., which is assembled right in the middle of the exhibits. Visitors can enjoy artifacts such as a slinky black-beaded costume worn by famous burlesque dancer Gypsy Rose Lee as well as an outfit worn by the Viking Giant Jóhann K. Pétursson, who was himself a member of the IISA. Visitors are also able to walk through carnie trailers, which open to transform from a dull-looking compartment into brightly lit and ornate facades.

=== Library connection ===
The library at the University of South Florida (USF) has digitized many of the photos at the International Independent Showmen's Museum. These photographs are a part of Special Collections at USF. The homepage of the collection describes the photographs as portraying the life and times of the American carnival from the late 1800s to today. The collection features many photographs that relate to means of transportation as relevant to the carnival, such as semi-trailers and trains.

Digital access to the collection is available through the USF website. The physical collection lives at the International Independent Showmen's Museum. Much of the digitization process was made possible by members of the International Independent Showmen's Association as well as a grant from the Community Foundation of Greater Sun City Center.

In addition to the collection of photographs, the USF Library has a digital collection of showmen's oral histories. An oral history is both "a method of recording and preserving oral testimony" and the product that comes from this process. These are valuable pieces of cultural heritage that capture the memories of a person during a particular time.

== Notable people ==
- Grady Stiles, freak show performer known as Lobster Boy
- Al Tomaini, former world's tallest man

== Media ==
- The town was the setting for the 1995 X-Files episode "Humbug", which was actually filmed in Vancouver, British Columbia. The episode is about sideshow performers but does not star any of the town's actual residents.
- The town figured prominently in the Dean Koontz book Twilight Eyes, which featured a character who sought refuge in the circus community and came back to "Gibtown" with them as the traveling season drew to a close.
- The town was the title character in the fictional first-person lyric of "Gibsonton," released on The Babylon Minstrels' self-titled CD in 1992. The song was written by Julian Raymond, the group's co-founder.
- Gibsonton is the inspiration for a novel called Kaleidoscope by Darrell Wimberly, who has written other novels and non-fiction set in west Florida.
- Gibsonton was the setting for the July 17, 2011 episode of the Florida-based A&E crime drama The Glades. The episode, titled "Gibtown," revolved around a murder in a town known as a haven for retired circus performers, and referenced former residents such as Percy the Monkey Boy, The Human Blockhead, Al Thornquist the 8 1/2 Foot Giant, and the Bertram Siamese Twins.
- In the novel Once Burned by Jeaniene Frost, Gibsonton is the hometown of the main heroine Leila, who after suffering a horrific accident as a teen could channel electricity and learn a person's darkest secrets through a single touch.
- Gibsonton was visited by Kevin Smith for a "Roadside Attractions" segment on The Tonight Show.
- Gibsonton was the theme of a song by Josh Reilly on his album "Mercy On The Strange".
- Bar Rescue filmed two episodes including one where Jon Taffer rescues a bar on the Alafia River.
- The town is one of three towns referenced in an Airbnb advertisement campaign, "have u considered," [sic] featuring rapper Xaviersobased, along with fellow rapper Zack Fox and pianist Precious Renee Tucker.
