= Grady Stiles =

American entertainer (1937–1992)

- Born: Grady Franklin Stiles Jr. June 26, 1937
- Died: November 29, 1992 (aged 55); Gibsonton, Florida, U.S.
- Other name: Lobster Boy
- Occupation: Sideshow performer
- Known for: Performing as "Lobster Boy"; 1978 murder conviction

Grady Franklin Stiles Jr. (June 26, 1937 – November 29, 1992) was an American freak show performer and murderer. He had the genetic condition ectrodactyly, in which the fingers and toes are fused together to form claw-like extremities. Because of this, Stiles performed under the stage name "Lobster Boy."

== Early life ==
Grady Franklin Stiles Jr. was born on June 26, 1937, the fourth child of Grady Franklin Stiles Sr. and Edna Stiles. According to his father, the Stiles family had a history of ectrodactyly, a rare genetic condition in which the fingers and toes are fused into claw-like extremities, dating back to the 1840s. For generations, relatives with ectrodactyly had been exhibited in traveling carnival sideshows, and Grady Stiles Sr. earned a living as a sideshow performer.

Growing up in the carnival industry, Stiles inherited the condition and, at the age of seven, joined his father's sideshow act, where he began performing under the stage name "Lobster Boy". He continued performing in traveling carnivals throughout his adult life.

In adulthood, Stiles married twice and had four children, two of whom also inherited ectrodactyly. He later toured with two of his children as The Lobster Family. During the winter months, when many carnival performers stopped touring, the family lived in Gibsonton, Florida.

== Personal life ==
Stiles was an alcoholic and was abusive to his family. Due to his ectrodactyly, he was unable to walk. While he sometimes used a wheelchair, he most commonly used his hands and arms for locomotion. He developed substantial upper body strength that, when combined with his bad temper and alcoholism, made him dangerous to others. Stiles' first wife, Mary Teresa, left him to marry Harry Glenn Newman, a little person who was billed as the "Smallest Man in the World".

== Murder and conviction ==
On September 28, 1978 in Pittsburgh, Pennsylvania, Stiles shot and killed his oldest daughter's fiancé on the eve of their wedding, as Stiles did not approve of him. He was brought to trial, where he openly confessed to killing the man and was convicted of third-degree murder. He was not sent to prison as no state institution was equipped to care for an inmate with ectrodactyly. Stiles was instead sentenced to house arrest and fifteen years probation.

== Later life and death ==
Stiles stopped drinking thereafter, and during this period remarried his first wife, Mary Teresa. However, he soon began drinking again and his family claimed that he became even more abusive.

In 1992, Teresa, together with her son from a previous marriage, Harry Glenn Newman Jr., hired a seventeen-year-old sideshow performer named Chris Wyant to kill Stiles for $1,500 (equivalent to $3,441 in 2025). As Stiles smoked a cigarette on the sofa while watching the video Monkey Boy, Wyant entered his home with a semi-automatic pistol and shot him in the head twice, killing him. Stiles was reportedly widely disliked in his community, so much so that only 10 people came to his funeral, and nobody volunteered as a pallbearer to carry his coffin.

Stiles' son, Grady Stiles III, disputes the claim that Mary Teresa had him murdered. According to him, his mother, Mary Teresa, and father were arguing. Mary Teresa had said 'Something needs to be done.' Teresa's son overheard this, and went to a neighbor and repeated those words. Mary Teresa was convicted of manslaughter; Harry Newman Jr. was convicted of first degree murder and received a life sentence, and Wyant was convicted of second degree murder and received a 27-year sentence.

== Media and popular culture ==
Fred Rosen wrote a book on the case called Lobster Boy: The Bizarre Life and Brutal Death of Grady Stiles Jr., and E! made a True Hollywood Story episode based on the case titled "The Murder of Lobster Boy". A&E Network also made a City Confidential episode based on the case called "Gibsonton: The Last Side Show".

Stiles' likeness appears on the album cover for Silverchair's Freak Show.

A person like Grady, going by the name of "Lobster Boy", appears in a Deadpool comic. Deadpool was hired to assassinate him, but fails when he figures out he is possessed by Xaphan, a fallen angel, and starts possessing the souls. He was later saved by the two Ghost Riders, but at the end is shot again in the head by Deadpool for being cruel to other freaks.

American Freakshow: The Terrible Tale of Sloth Boy, a graphic novel published by IDW Publishing, tells the tale of Dante Browning, a carnival sideshow performer with clawed hands who, because of his abuse and cruelty to his family, is shot to death by a hit man hired by his wife and stepson while in his home in Gibsonton, Florida.

American Horror Story: Freak Show has a Lobster Boy character. It also includes a small statue in the likeness of Stiles in the opening credits. In addition, a snapshot of Stiles is briefly seen at the American Morbidity Museum in the third episode ("Edward Mordrake, Part I").

John Strohm wrote "Ballad of Lobster Boy," inspired by Grady Stiles and recorded the song for his 1999 album Vestavia.

In his memoir Tibetan Peach Pie, author Tom Robbins refers to Stiles' life and death.

The American history comedy podcastThe Dollop did an episode in 2014 discussing Grady Stiles.

The first episode of the Discovery show Killer Carnies, titled "The Sideshow Murders," tells the story of Stiles' murder.

British progressive rock band Circu5 created a fictional narrative centred on a high-functioning psychopath assigned the codename “Grady”, a reference to Grady Stiles.
