= Al Tomaini =

American entertainer, former world's tallest person

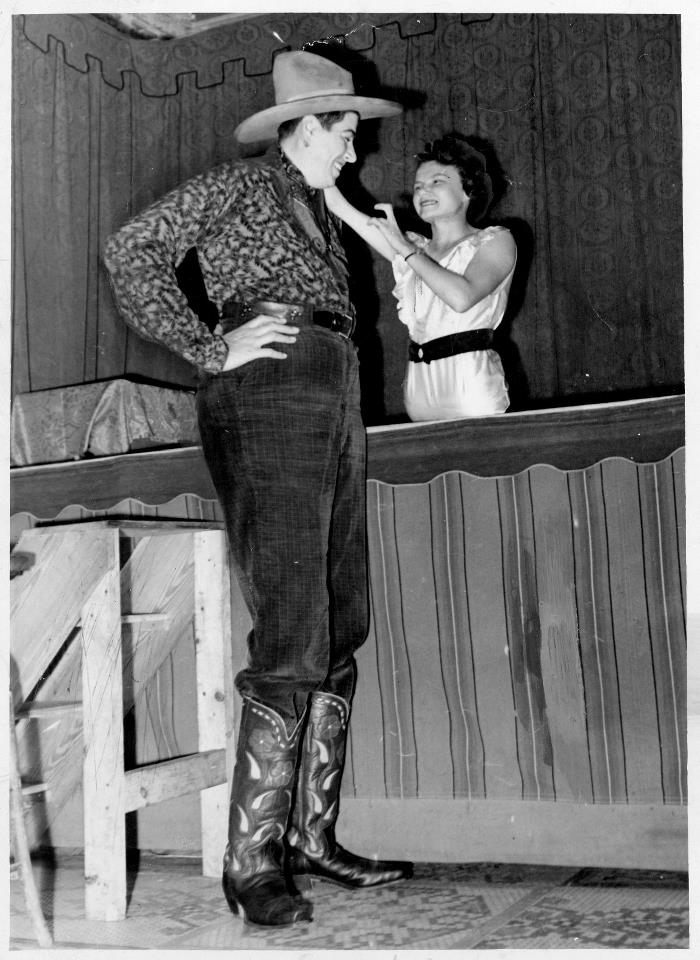
- Al Tomaini and his wife Jeanie
- Born: Aurelio Tomaini; February 25, 1912; Long Branch, New Jersey, US
- Died: August 30, 1962 (aged 50); Gibsonton, Florida, US
- Resting place: Samford Cemetery in Riverview, Florida
- Occupation: Sideshow performer
- Height: 7 ft 4 in (2.24 m)
- Board member of: Chamber of Commerce
- Spouse: Jeanie Tomaini (m. 1936)
- Children: 2 adopted daughters
- Relatives: Alex Tomaini (grandson)

Aurelio "Al" Tomaini (February 25, 1912 – August 30, 1962), was once the world's tallest person. Tomaini claimed a height of 7 ft 4 in (2.24 m), weighed 357 lb (162 kg) and wore size 26 shoes. He worked as a traveling sideshow performer and fire chief.

Tomaini was the son of Santo Tomaini and Maria Bossone. At the age of 12, he was taller than his father, who stood 6 ft 3 in (1.91 m) tall. He had a great-grandfather in Italy who was also of abnormal height. His parents consulted a physician who diagnosed the cause of his giantism to be an over-active pituitary gland, similar to other human giants.

As a sideshow performer, he worked in a circus at the Great Lakes Exposition in Cleveland in 1943, when he met his future wife, Jeanie Smith. After eloping from the circus, the couple settled in the circus community of Gibsonton, Florida.

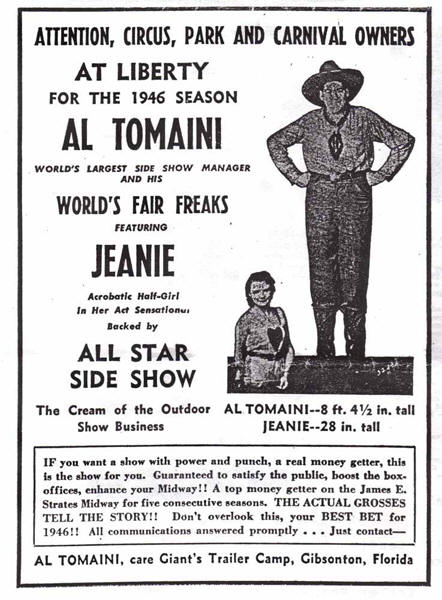
Flyer by Al and Jeanie, advertising them as available for hire.

There he became active in community affairs. He was owner and operator of Giant's Camp Lodge and Fish Camp, a television repair shop and a tourist trailer court. He also worked as fire chief and president of the Gibsonton Fire Association.

He died in 1962 and was buried at Samford Cemetery in Florida.
