= Ronnie and Donnie Galyon =

Oldest conjoined twins (1951–2020)

- Born: Ronald Lee Galyon; Donald Lee Galyon; October 28, 1951; Dayton, Ohio, U.S.
- Died: July 4, 2020 (aged 68); Dayton, Ohio, U.S.
- Occupations: Sideshow attractions, reality TV personalities
- Known for: Oldest set of conjoined twins ever

Ronald Lee Galyon and Donald Lee Galyon (October 28, 1951 – July 4, 2020) were American conjoined twins from Dayton, Ohio. According to the 2009 Guinness World Records, the Galyons were the oldest living set of conjoined twins in the world, and, as of October 29, 2014, possessed the world record for the longest-lived conjoined twins in history when they surpassed prior record holders Chang and Eng Bunker.

== Early life and career ==
The twins were born at St. Elizabeth Hospital in Dayton, Ohio, on October 28, 1951, to Wesley and Eileen Galyon. Eileen was not expecting twins. Each had their heart and most other major internal organs, and their own arms and legs, but they were joined at the front from the sternum to the groin and shared some internal organs such as the lower intestine. The twins each had their own bladder but shared a single penis and rectum. After a two-year stay in the hospital, it was determined that they could not be safely separated. Local schools deemed the twins a distraction, so they were not formally educated, resulting in their life-long functional illiteracy.

With nine children to support, their father Wesley decided to take the twins on the road as a sideshow attraction. The boys were exhibited in sideshows throughout the U.S. and later in Latin America and Canada. Their tours made them celebrities and provided an income with which they supported their family.

== Later life ==
In 1991, after three decades in entertainment, the pair retired and moved into their first independent home in Dayton, Ohio, in a house purchased with sideshow earnings. They were active in the community and lived a largely normal life by means of a custom double wheelchair.

Although retired from show business, the twins made numerous television appearances. They appeared on The Jerry Springer Show in 1997, a Discovery Channel documentary in 1998 and a Channel Five documentary in 2009. They were interviewed for the 1999 American documentary film Sideshow: Alive on the Inside.

In 2009, Ronnie developed a life-threatening infection in his lungs, which quickly endangered both twins. After their hospitalization, they required round-the-clock care. The house they lived in was no longer suitable and the twins were unwilling to move to assisted living. Their younger brother Jim and his wife Mary, who lived in the same city, were unable to bring the twins into their home as it was not handicap accessible, until an outpouring of donations and volunteers from the local community assisted in building a special addition to the home. On December 22, 2010, TLC premiered "The World's Oldest Conjoined Twins Move Home", which documented the building process as well as the twins' recovery and their return to the community.

== Death ==
The twins died of congestive heart failure in a hospice surrounded by their family in their native Dayton, Ohio, on July 4, 2020, at the age of 68. As per their final wishes, a custom casket was built for the twins to rest in together. They were buried at David’s Cemetery in Kettering, Ohio.
