= Haussner's Restaurant =

Restaurant in Baltimore

Coordinates: 39°17′11.4″N 76°34′12.6″W

- Interactive map of Haussner's Restaurant

Restaurant information
- Established: 1926
- Closed: 1999
- Food type: American
- Location: 3244 Eastern Ave Baltimore, MD 21224, Baltimore, Maryland, United States

Haussner's Restaurant was opened by William Henry Haussner in 1926 and became one of Baltimore's most famous landmarks over the next 73 years.

The restaurant was closed in 1999, and its collection of 19th-century European and American paintings, which included pieces from the estates of J.P. Morgan, Cornelius Vanderbilt and Henry Walters, was auctioned by Sotheby's in New York City for $10 million. The restaurant officially served its last meal on Wednesday, October 6, 1999.

The site of the restaurant and its business content was donated to the owner of the former Baltimore International College. In 2011 the site was purchased by Joseph Schultz, owner of Schultz Development LLC, a Baltimore home and rehab company. In 2015, the building was purchased by Garver Development Group. Haussner's was demolished in July 2016 by Access Demolition & Environmental Services. Old Town Construction has constructed a 6-story high rise apartment building in its place.

A 1992 photo of the interior and four example paintings from the restaurant's collection are shown below:

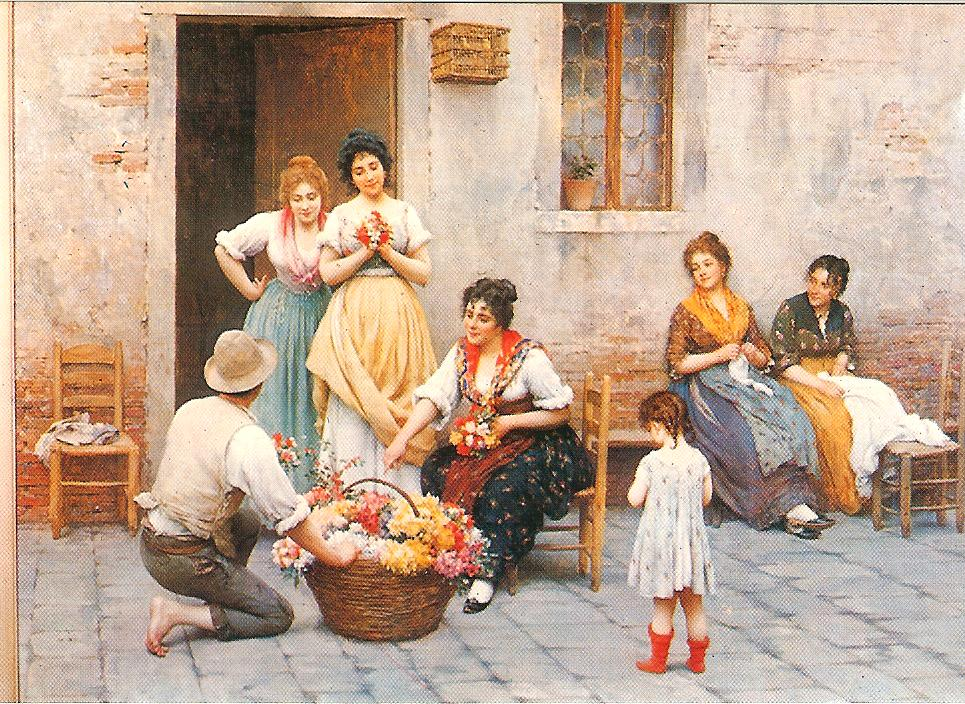
Eugene de Blaas: The Venetian Flower Vendor

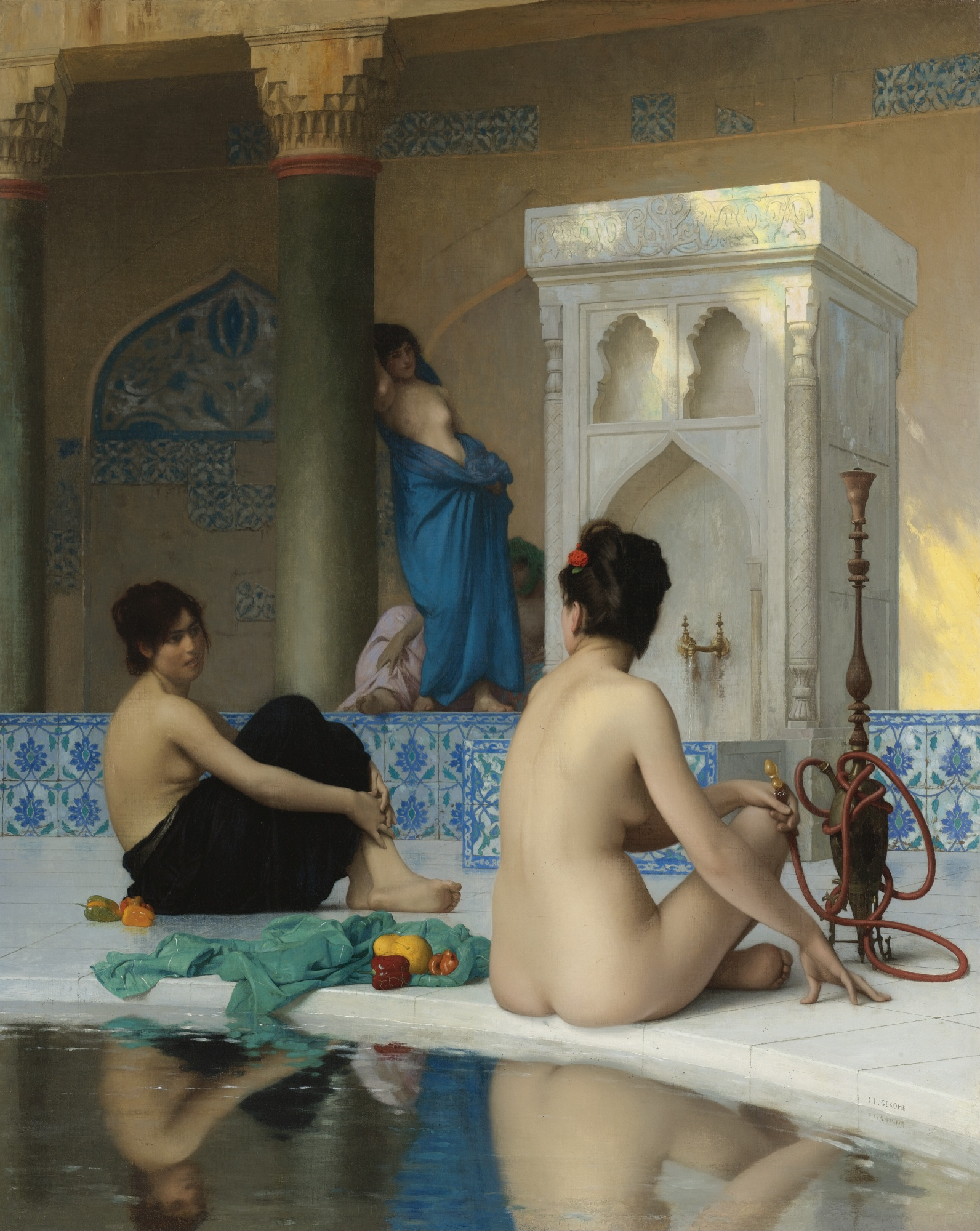
Jean-Léon Gérôme: After the Bath

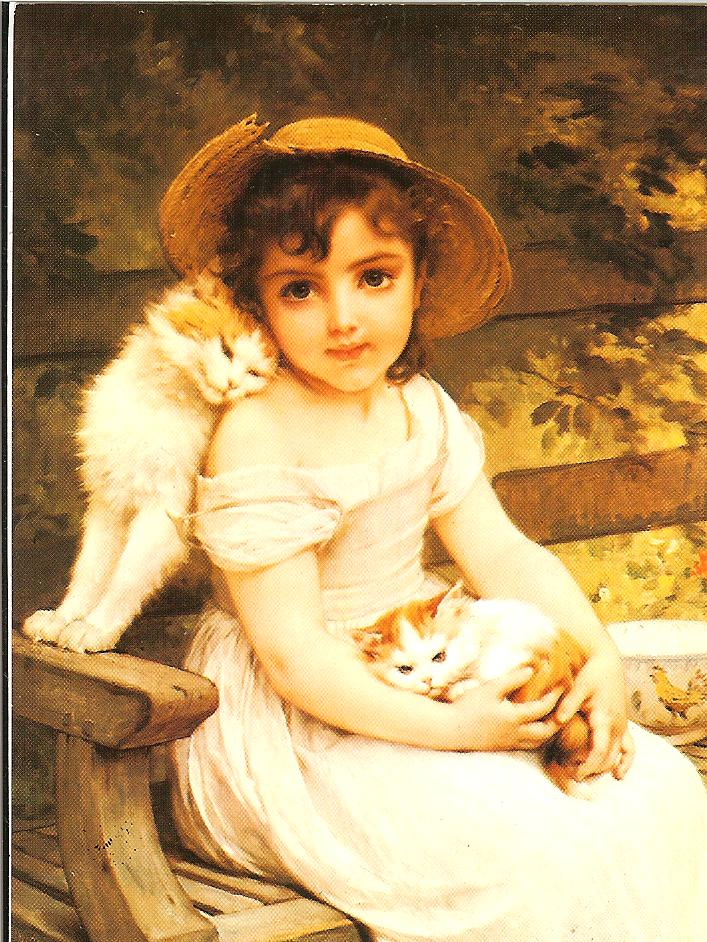
Emile Munier: Girl with kittens

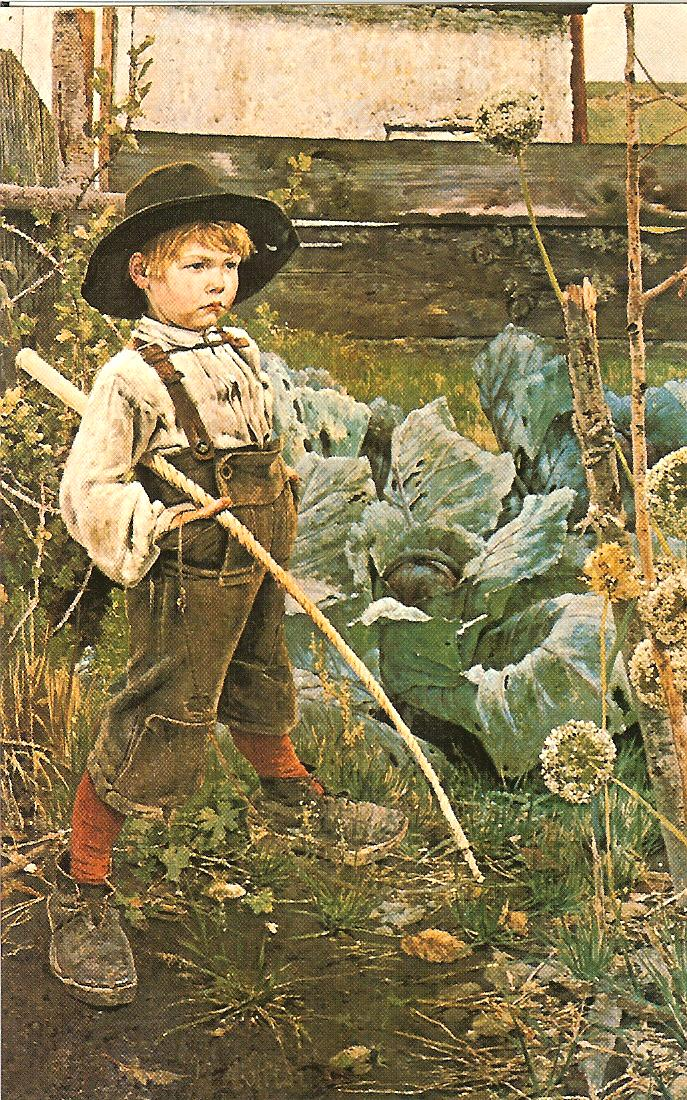
Joseph Molitor von Mühlfeld: Master of all he surveys

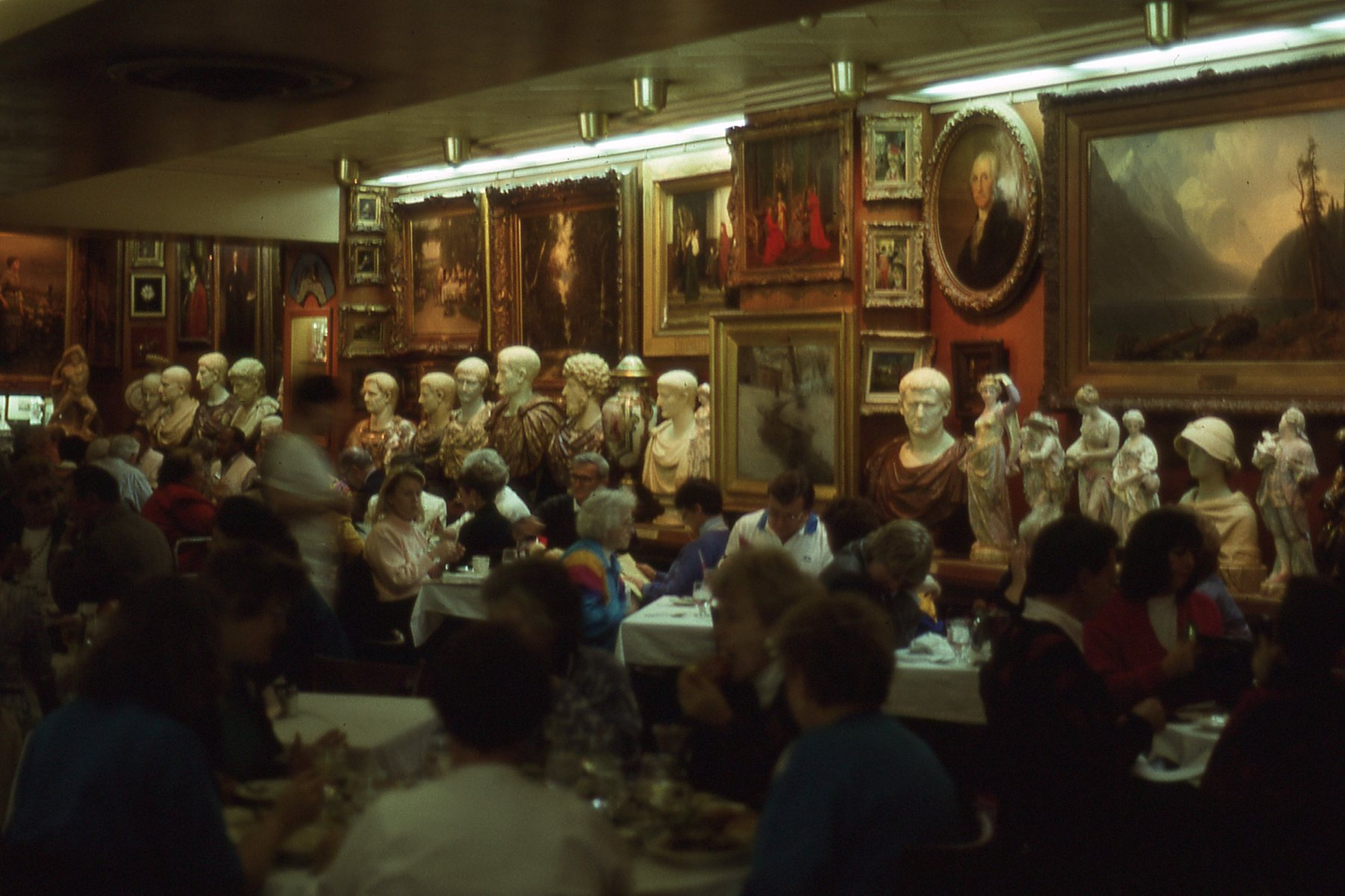
Marvin Maxwell: Haussner's Restaurant interior circa 1992

== In popular culture ==
In season 3, episode 1 ("Out of Town") of the television series Mad Men, Don Draper and Sal Romano go to Baltimore to meet with the London Fog company and have dinner at Haussner's with two flight attendants and a pilot.

== Links ==
Walter Gilliam Chef at Haussners for over forty years.

Frances Wilke Haussner, Matriarch of Restaurant dies at 91
