= Human blockhead =

Carnival or sideshow performers

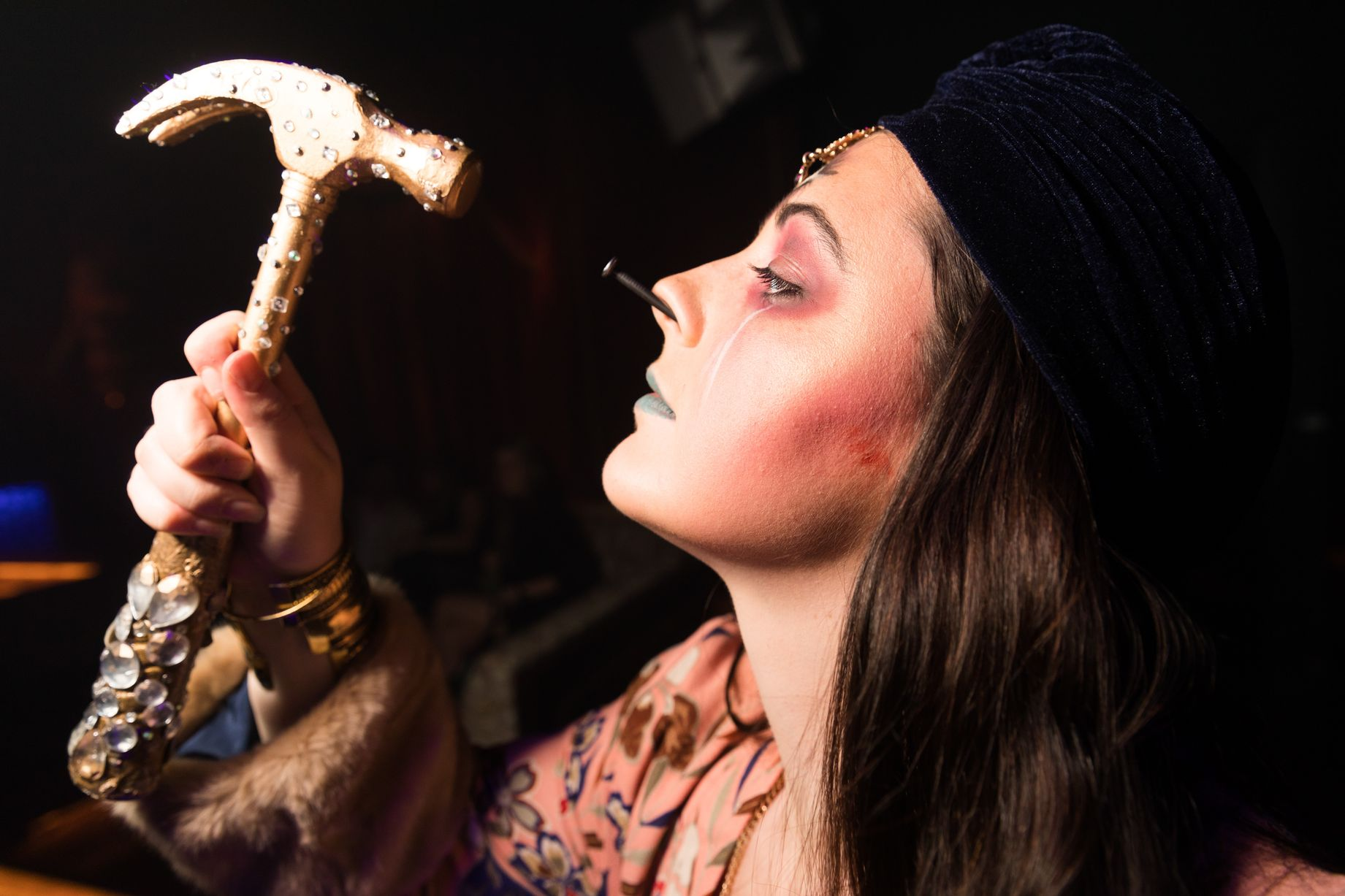
Performing human blockhead

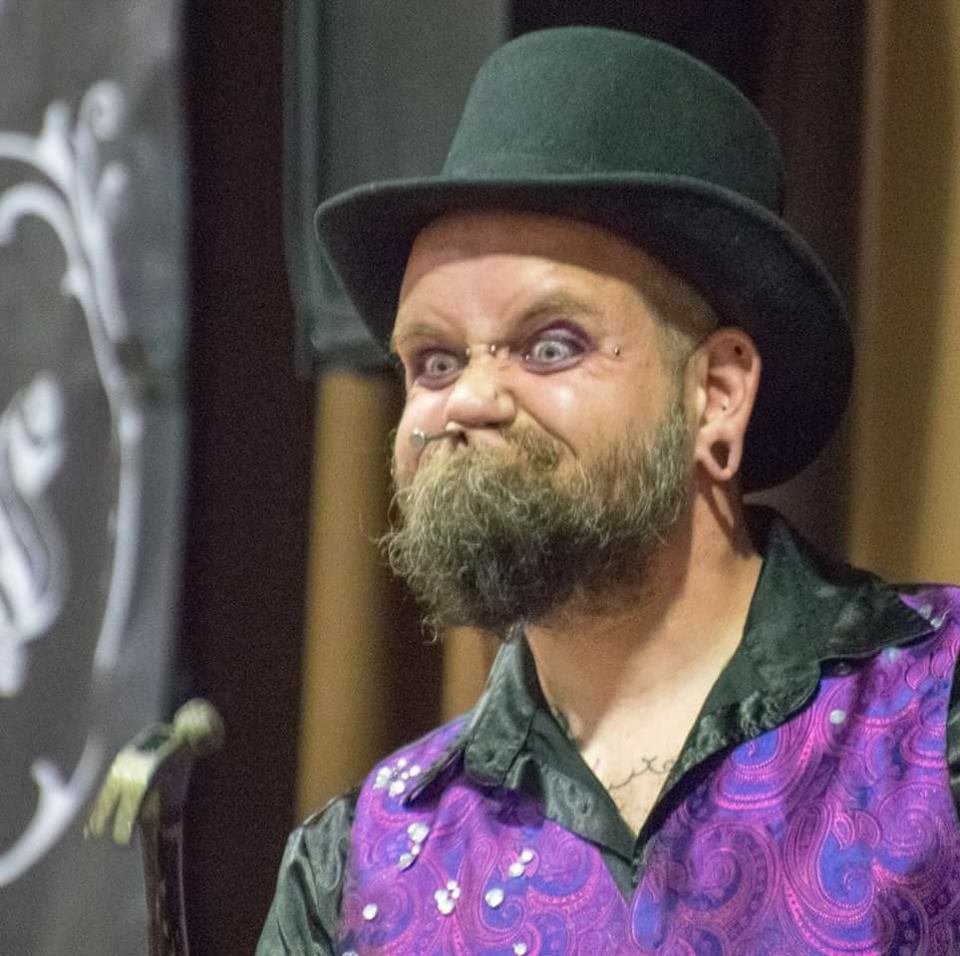
Professional sideshow performer, Captain Darron von Awesome of Tinderbox Circus Sideshow, who can perform this variation of the human blockhead

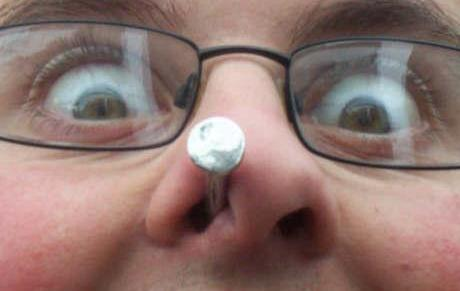
Close-up of the human blockhead using a 6-inch (15 cm) nail

A human blockhead is a carnival or sideshow performer who hammers a nail or other implement (such as an ice pick, awl or screwdriver) into their nasal cavity via the nostril.

== Method ==
The stunt is often scary to audiences, who believe that the nail is being hammered into the skull itself. In reality, the stunt plays on the anatomical misconception that the nasal cavity goes upward, rather than straight back. The performer merely learns the terrain of the nasal cavity and lessens their sensitivity (and urge to sneeze) until the implement can be slid straight back through the nasal cavity until it hits the back of the throat.

The use of a hammer merely adds to the shock value by creating the illusion that the nail is being pounded through bone. One performer, Doc Swami, pushed the nail too far such that it got lost; however, shaking the head and blowing the nose can dislodge the nail. Some performers have gone so far as to use a power drill.

== History ==
Sideshow performer, Herbie Hatman of 999 Eyes Freakshow, blockheads a butter knife

This stunt is said to have been developed by renowned magician and sideshow performer Melvin Burkhart (1907–2001) after his nose was broken in a boxing bout and he became fascinated by the way that the doctors inserted instruments into his nose. Since then, it has become one of the staple acts of the sideshow. Over the years, several variations of the act have been developed by numerous performers, using objects including running power drills, fireworks, lit fire-eating rods, condoms, balloons, cork screws, letter openers, straws, spoons, forks and ice picks.

In 2005, scientific skeptic and investigator James Randi criticized faith healer John of God of Brazil for his use of this carnival trick to convince unsuspecting people, some desperately ill, of his paranormal healing powers. Randi and others also criticized news media outlets ABC, CNN, and Oprah Winfrey for uncritically promoting the faith healer's quackery.

On November 23, 2009, The National Geographic Channel's Humanly Impossible series aired an episode "Human Blockhead" examining this trick with a visual camera probe inserted through the nostril and up to four inches into the sinus cavity.

One example of a variation of the original Human Blockhead act is the "Human Meathead", created in 2000 by Ryan Stock. The performer displays a large meat hook and then proceeds to force it into the nostril, through his nasal cavity and out his mouth. When performing this stunt, Ryan Stock has said that he had suspended up to 70lbs from the end of the inserted hook.

== See also ==
- Circus skills
