= Sideshow =

Theatrical genre

In North America, a sideshow is an extra, secondary production associated with a circus, carnival, fair, or other such attraction. They historically featured human oddity exhibits (so-called “freak shows”), preserved specimens (real or fabricated, such as the Fiji Mermaid), live animal acts, burlesque or strip shows, actually or ostensibly dangerous stunts, or stunts that appear painful like human blockhead.

Most modern sideshows feature fewer to no animal acts, and have a greater focus on trainable feats or consensual body modification rather than exhibiting people with congenital disabilities, either due to changing public opinion or local laws prohibiting the exhibition of disabled people or animals.

Trainable acts associated with sideshows include sword swallowing, fire breathing and manipulation, magic and visual illusions, human blockhead, knife throwing, lying on a bed of nails, contortion, and may also include an overlap with circus acts such as juggling, aerial hoop/silk/chains acrobatics, and motorcycle stunts like the Globe of Death. Whether such an act is considered “sideshow” or “circus” depends on how the show itself is billed, or advertised, to potential viewers.

== In popular culture ==
“Sideshow” as a theme is associated with the strange, grotesque, provocative, and taboo. Some movies, TV shows, Halloween decoration manufacturers, and live performers have adopted these aesthetics, which may include dramatic costumes, dangerous stunts, deformed humans or animals, sexual themes, horror elements, and other provocative or disturbing imagery.

The horror anthology American Horror Story: Freak Show involved sideshow themes throughout its story and promotional materials. It features dramatized versions of real sideshow performers from history, such as the ectrodactyl character Jimmy Darling, portrayed by Evan Peters in prosthetic makeup, based on the real “Lobster Boy”, Grady Stiles Jr. The show also featured actors with real congenital abnormalities, such as Mat Fraser, born with phocomelia, and Jyoti Amge, the world’s smallest living woman.

== Types ==
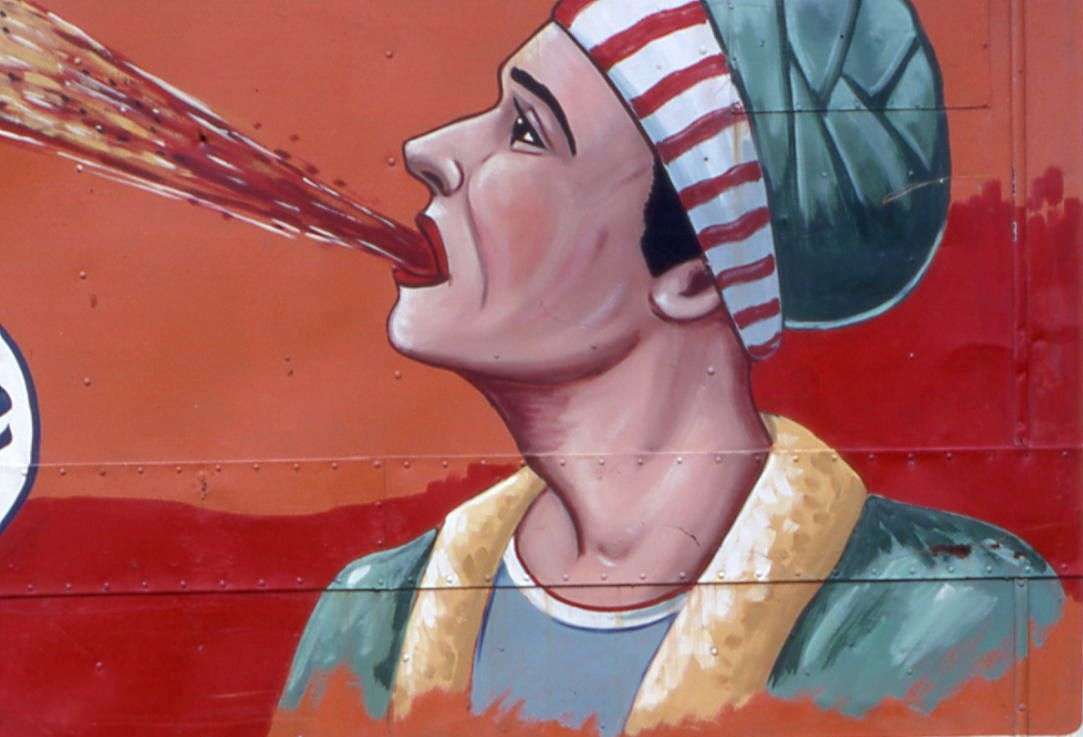
Painting on sideshow truck, firebreather, Florida, 1966

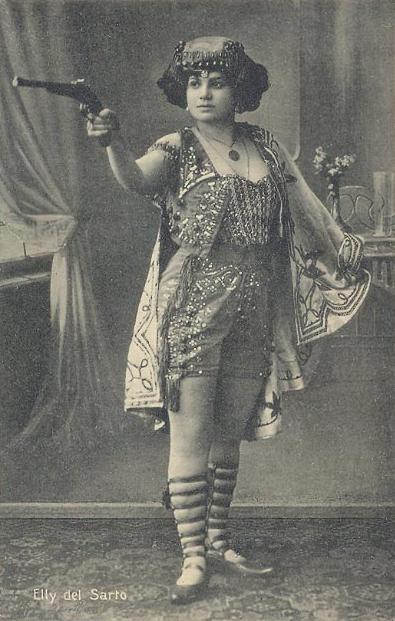
Elly del Sarto, a sideshow performer, in c. 1910

There are four main types of classic sideshow attractions:

- The Ten-in-One offers a program of ten sequential acts under one tent for a single admission price. The ten-in-one might be partly a freak show exhibiting "human oddities" (including "born freaks" such as midgets, giants or persons with other deformities, or "made freaks" like tattooed people, fat people or "human skeletons"—extremely thin men often "married" to the fat lady, like Isaac W. Sprague). However, for variety's sake, the acts in a ten-in-one would also include "working acts" who would perform magic tricks or daredevil stunts. In addition, the freak show performers might also perform acts or stunts, and would often sell souvenirs like "giant's rings" or "pitch cards" with their photos and life stories. The ten-in-one would often end in a "blowoff" or "ding," an extra act not advertised on the outside, which could be viewed for an additional fee. The blowoff act would be described provocatively, often as something deemed too strong for women and children, such as pickled punks.
- The Single-O is a single attraction, for example a single curiosity like the "Bonnie and Clyde Death Car" or Hitler's staff car, a "Giant Rat" (actually usually a nutria) or other unusual animal, a "What Is It?" (often a convincing but artificial monstrosity like the Fiji Mermaid) or a freak show often billed as "See the Victim of Drug Abuse."
- A Museum Show which might be deceptively billed as "World's Greatest Freaks Past and Present," is a sideshow in which the exhibits are usually not alive. It might include tanks of piranhas or cages with unusual animals, stuffed freak animals or other exotic items like the weapons or cars allegedly used by famous murderers. Some of the exhibits might even be dummies or photographs of the billed attractions. It could still be truthfully billed with the claim "$1,000 reward if not absolutely real—please do not touch or feed the animals on exhibit". The Single-O and the Museum Show are usually operated as "grind shows," meaning that patrons may enter at any time, viewing the various exhibits at their leisure.
- A Girl Show was sometimes offered in which women were the primary attraction. These could range from the revue (such as a "Broadway Revue") with fully clothed performers to the racier "kootch" or "hootchie-kootchie" show (a strip show) which might play either partly clothed or "strong" (nude).

== Legality ==
Modern sideshows in North America have significantly fewer or no human oddities, and few to no traveling girl shows, due to both a changing public opinion and local laws prohibiting the exhibition of disabled people or animals, as well as stricter regulation of nude performance and designated locations they can legally occur.

In Michigan, since 1931 it has been a misdemeanor to display deformed or disabled humans as part of an exhibit, whether for free or by charging for tickets, except as part of medical education.

In Florida, as of 2024 it is a misdemeanor offense to display deformed animals in any place where a fee is charged. There is currently no law in Florida prohibiting human oddity exhibition.

Most traveling burlesque dancers now work in dedicated legal venues such as cabarets or strip clubs, rather than as part of a carnival midway as was typical in the 20th century.

== Racism and exploitation ==
Particularly in the United States, sideshows historically included practices such as the purchase of human beings, the display of human zoos, exploitation of the mentally disabled who could not consent to perform, segregation of performers and customers, especially in girl shows (nearly or fully nude performances), and minstrel shows.

In 1835, African-American woman Joice Heth was enslaved and sold to John S. Bowling and later P.T. Barnum, and was exhibited in sideshows under the false claim that she was the “161-year-old nursing mammy of George Washington.” After her death she was publicly autopsied, for which Barnum charged admission.

Up until the mid 20th century, revues (girl shows) in the United States were racially segregated. Additionally, Black customers were prohibited from viewing white women performers, while anyone was permitted to see Black women.

In the 1999 book Girl Show: Into the Canvas World of Bump and Grind, a former “girl show” owner is quoted as saying:

“When we played in Texas we couldn’t let black airmen into our show because the girls were white. These guys weren’t allowed to see white strippers but they could go overseas and be killed for their country. That was OK? We didn’t like it but the fair board and local police made the rules. This was up into the late 1950s and possibly the early 1960s.”

== Early history and acts ==
By the 1830s, "outside shows" began to be established alongside travelling circuses. Initially, the circuses distanced themselves from the sideshows, but in 1850, a relationship was established between them.

"DeclineWorking acts" often exhibited a number of stunts that could be counted on to draw crowds. These stunts used little-known methods and offered the elements of danger and excitement. Such acts included fire eating, sword swallowing, knife throwing, body piercing, lying on a bed of nails, walking up a ladder of sharp swords, and more.

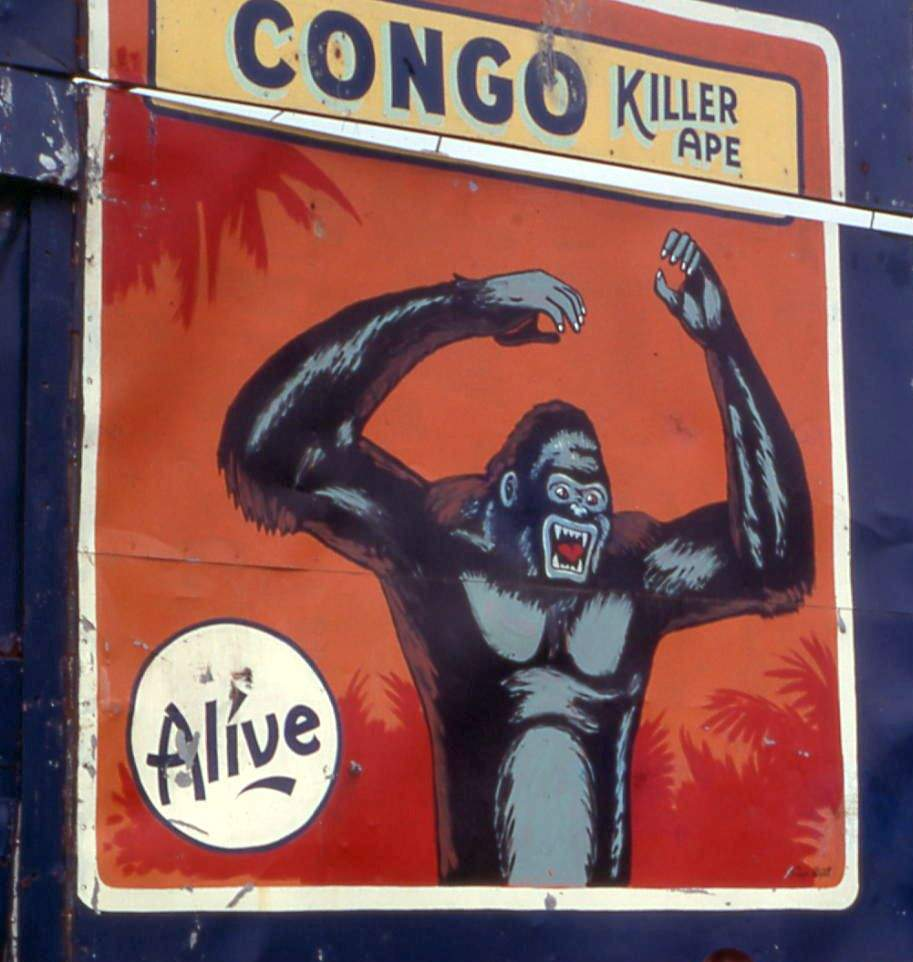
Decaying sideshow advertisement, Florida, 1966

Interest in sideshows declined as television made it easy (and free) to see the world's most exotic attractions. Moreover, viewing "human oddities" became distasteful as the public conscience changed, and many localities passed laws forbidding the exhibition of freaks. The performers often protested (to no avail) that they had no objection to the sideshow, especially since it provided not only a good income for them, but in many cases it provided their only possible job.

Emmitt Bejano, a man with ichthyosis who performed as “The Alligator Boy”, said: “[Sideshow work] keeps me off the relief line.”

== Revival in North America ==
With legal restrictions on human oddity exhibitions, most modern sideshows feature performances of trainable stunts and body modifications, which can but do not necessarily require congenital abnormalities.

In 2013, Gary Turner, born with Ehlers-Danlos syndrome, performed as Gary Stretch with The Circus of Horrors, alongside other performers such as Jesus Aceves, a man born with hypertrichosis billed as “Wolfboy”, who walked on swords as part of his act.

John Haze, owner of the show, said of their sword swallower with body modifications Hannibal Helmurto:

"He wore a normal suit and had no tattoos. Ten years later he turned up at the Hackney Empire and he had completely changed his body."

In modern times, sideshow performers are often individual professionals or groups. A greater number of "Single O" attractions still tour carnivals.

In the 1940s, Ward Hall began the World of Wonders Amazement Show, which is still running today. It is the oldest carnival sideshow organization in America and is currently owned and run by Thomas Breen. In 1970, John Strong Jr (son of John Strong of The John Strong 3 Ring Tented Circus) began a 47-year continuous run of traveling sideshow, The Strong Sideshow. Several acts and artifacts toured over the years such as the 5-legged dog, Chupacabra, a 2-headed cow, and a mummy. John Jr. performed all the live acts himself for several years including sword swallowing, fire eating, bed of nails blade box and electric chair. After living the lifestyle for a lifetime, The Strong Sideshow is now in residency at "The Sideshow Museum", in Uranus, Missouri.

In the early 1990s, Jim Rose developed a modern sideshow called "the Jim Rose Circus", reinventing the sideshow with two types of acts that would attract modern audiences and stay within legal bounds. The show featured acts reviving traditional sideshow stunts and carrying some of them to extremes, and "fringe" artists (often exhibiting extreme body modification) performing bizarre or masochistic acts like eating insects, lifting weights by means of hooks inserted in their body piercings, or stapling currency to their forehead. The show drew audiences at venues unknown to old-time sideshows, like rock clubs and the 1992 Lollapalooza festival.

The Jim Rose Circus held its last known performance in 2013 at The London Burlesque Festival. The impact of the Jim Rose Circus on pop culture inspired a new wave of performers. There are now more sideshow performers than at any other time in the genre's history. At the same time in Canada, Scott McClelland, grandson of itinerant showman N.P. Lewchuk, formed Carnival Diablo, a show that performs frequently to this day. The success of these shows sparked a growing number of performers to revive the traditional sideshow arts, taught by sideshow veterans, and many now perform in spot engagements from rock clubs and comedy clubs to corporate events.

"Sideshows by the Seashore", sponsored by Coney Island USA in Brooklyn, New York City, has performed since 1983, and tours under the name "Coney Island Circus Sideshow".

Circus historian and collector Ken Harck ran the Brothers Grim Sideshow, which toured with the OzzFest music festival in the summer of 2006 and 2007.

== Revival in Australia ==
Chayne Hultgren, known as the Space Cowboy, has earned 56 Guinness World Records for his stunts. He owns Australia's largest traveling oddity museum, called The Mutant Barnyard, which toured to various museums until 2022.

== Notable sideshow performers ==
- Aurelio "Al" Tomaini — Once the world's tallest person
- Daisy and Violet Hilton — Conjoined sisters and musicians
- Francesco "Frank" Lentini — "The Three-Legged Man"
- Jeanie Tomaini — "The World’s Only Living Half-Girl"
- Johnny Eck — "The Half Man" / "The Amazing Half-Boy"
- Melvin Burkhart — Human blockhead, sword swallower, magician
- Space Cowboy (Chayne Hultgren) — multiple Guinness World Record-holding Australian stunt performer
- Percilla Bejano — "The Monkey Girl"
- Ronnie and Donnie Galyon — Oldest living conjoined twins
- Sandra Reed — Sword swallower with albinism, at one time held the Guinness World Record for most swords swallowed simultaneously by a woman
- Stanislaus Berent — "Sealo the Seal Boy"
- William "Bill" Durks — "The Man with Three Eyes"

== See also ==
- The Circus of Horrors
- Category:Sideshow performers
