= Yemi A.D. =

Czech choreographer (born 1981)

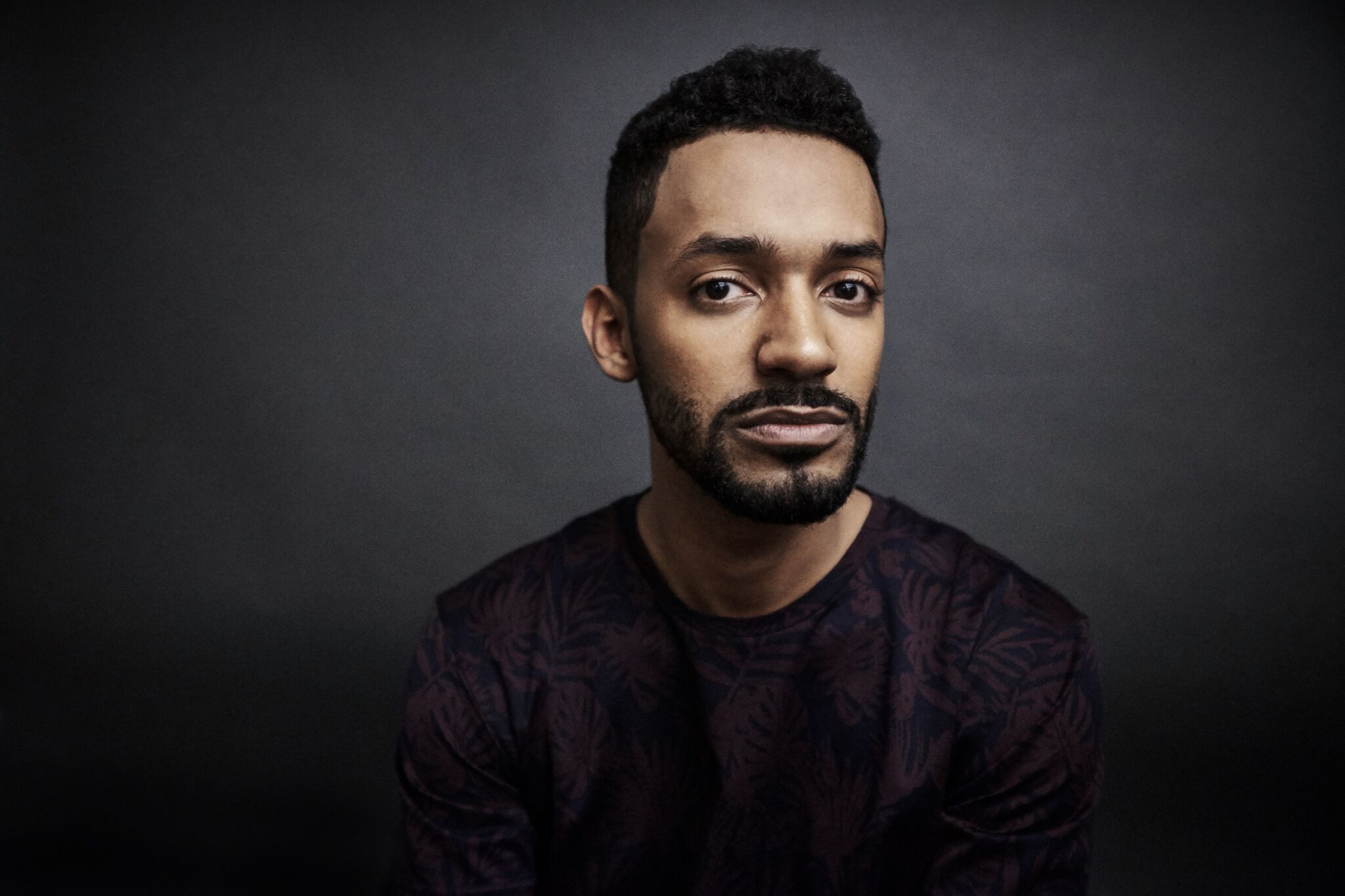
- Yemi A.D. in 2019
- Born: Yemi Akinyemi Dele; 4 November 1981 (age 44); Liberec, Czechoslovakia
- Occupations: Multidisciplinary creative, serial entrepreneur
- Years active: 1999–present

Yemi Akinyemi Dele (born 4 November 1981) is a Czech multidisciplinary creative and serial entrepreneur. In December 2022, he was selected as one of eight crew members for dearMoon, a cancelled commercial lunar space mission.

== Life and career ==
Yemi Akinyemi Dele was born on 4 November 1981. He was born ad grew up in Liberec, Czechoslovakia (now the Czech Republic). He was raised by a Nigerian father who had previously studied at the University of Economics in Prague, and by a Czech mother. When he was four, his father was arrested as part of an armed coup and could not return to the Czech Republic for another 18 years. With the advent of internet connectivity in the Czech Republic, Yemi used his technological skills to locate his long-lost father, as well as an extended family unit.

In July 2010, he came out as gay.

=== Career ===
At the age of sixteen, Yemi moved to Prague for education and work. Soon, he began to teach dance in the Netherlands and Sweden and study street dance in Los Angeles at MaDonna Grimes, a Hollywood dance school.

In 1999, Yemi returned to Prague, Czech Republic, where he founded JAD Dance Company (JAD DC), a Czech and international team of dancers and choreographers. Yemi's works and performances have been well received in many cities around the world including Tokyo, London, Barcelona, Bombay, Los Angeles, Shanghai, Paris and New York.

Yemi produced the first music video for Ben Cristovao and the music video of American rapper Turbo T. Double's song ATOMS.

==== JAD Dance Company ====
Through JAD Dance Company (JAD DC), he focused on his original dance style called Street FUSION. One notable work of JAD Dance Company is their collaboration with Kanye West as his principal (main) dancers in his 'Runaway (2010 film). Later on, Yemi set up Dance Academy Prague (DAP), where people from diverse age groups and ability/experience in dance can learn dance styles such as hip-hop, modern ballet, jazz, contemporary, MTV style, and dance hall, from choreographers of diverse nationalities (up to date, Yemi teaches Street FUSHION in DAP). After training/practice sessions, some students at DAP are given the opportunity to perform live in the streets of Prague, on stage for various corporations and occasions, and in local and international competitions.

==== JAD Productions ====
In 2010, Yemi founded the globally award-winning production company, JAD Productions, whose portfolio includes clients such as Google, Apple, Coca-Cola, T-Mobile, adidas Originals and Mercedes Benz. In 2022, JAD was also recognised for Anti-Panic, its digital innovation and non-profit initiative responses to pandemic challenges in Central Europe. JAD’s original productions range from Teniskology, a European sneaker festival; to Ynspirology, a music, art & culture festival; to Cycles, an immersive theatrical experience.

==== Work with Kanye West ====
In 2010, the hip-hop rapper Kanye West hired Yemi to choreograph a ballet-inspired sequence in the Runaway of the "Beautiful Dark Twisted Fantasy" album. The piece was well received and Kanye West commissioned Yemi to create choreography for West's Runaway performance in Los Angeles for VMA's 2010 and for Saturday Night Live performances of "Power" and "Runaway". The collaboration continued with Yemi creating choreography for other songs of the "Beautiful Dark Twisted Fantasy" album for Kanye West's global tour. West tweeted about Yemi, who was also quoted in GQ Magazine regarding Kanye West.

==== Work with Charlie Straight ====
In 2011, Charlie Straight, a Czech indie-rock band, asked Yemi to direct their music video, "School Beauty Queen", which was later awarded the Music Video of the Year in 2011 by MTV Czech.

==== Moonshot Platform ====
In 2021, Yemi founded Moonshot Platform Inc., a U.S.-based 501(c)(3) non-profit organization previously operating from Europe, whose mission is to seek and accelerate emerging leaders and their organizations around the world who work on solutions to the 21st Century Grand Challenges & SDG-focused innovations. The platform, supported by former U.S. Secretary Madeleine Albright, hosted five conferences across Europe and the U.S. in 2021 with over 650 C-level change-makers and 60 international speakers, reaching over three million people.

In 2022 the platform hosted Moonshot Awards, a global search for social innovators that received applications from 88 countries. Moonshot is also committed to provide mentorship to its members and hosted Moonshot Young Leaders Camp for 50 young change makers and their senior mentors in Massachusetts in 2023.

==== Other works ====
As a performer, Yemi has acted in several foreign productions such as Chronicles of Narnia II - Prince Caspian, Red Tails, and Unfaithful Klara (Italy, 2009).

He has delivered interactive seminars about the future of intergenerational creativity as a keynote at TEDx and the Czech Singularity University Summit (2019).

=== Spaceflight ===
In 2021, Yemi A.D. submitted an application for the dearMoon mission, a privately funded mission to orbit the moon backed by Yusaku Maezawa. This initiative sought eight individuals from diverse creative backgrounds to make the journey to the moon aboard a SpaceX Starship. In the spring of 2022, Yemi secured a spot in the preliminary group of 20 candidates.

Yemi's selection for the lunar mission was confirmed on December 8, 2022. Following delays to the Starship program, the mission was cancelled in 2024.

== Choreography ==
- "Runaway" – "Runaway Movie" (2010)
- Saturday Night Live – "Runaway" & "Power" performances for Kanye West (2010)
- MTV Video Music Awards (2010)
- Coachella Festival (2011)
- Mawazine Festival (2011)
- Splendour In The Grass Festival (2011)
- European Festival Tour (Lisbon, Portugal / Herdforshire, UK / Bergen, Norway / Oslo, Norway / Copenhagen, Denmark / Gothenburg, Sweden / Helsinki, Finland / Krakow, Poland) (2011)
- XBOX Modern Warfare 3 Convention (Los Angeles, CA); Essence Festival (New Orleans, LA) (2011)
- SummerFest Festival (2011)
- Austin City Limits Music Festival (2011)
- Big Day Out Australian Tour (2012)

== Direction and production ==
- Internet Viral Campaign – for NIC.CZ
- Music Video Ben Cristovao – "Give Me Some More"
- Music Video Charlie Straight – "School Beauty Queen"
- Music Video for MISTA – "Never Hide"
- Music Video Kanye West – "Lost In The World"
- Music Video for Polica – "Wandering Star"

== Awards ==
- 24 Most Influential People in Czech Republic voted by MF Dnes, most respected Czech Daily Press (2010)
