= Tourism on the Moon =

Future plans to make the Moon available for tourism

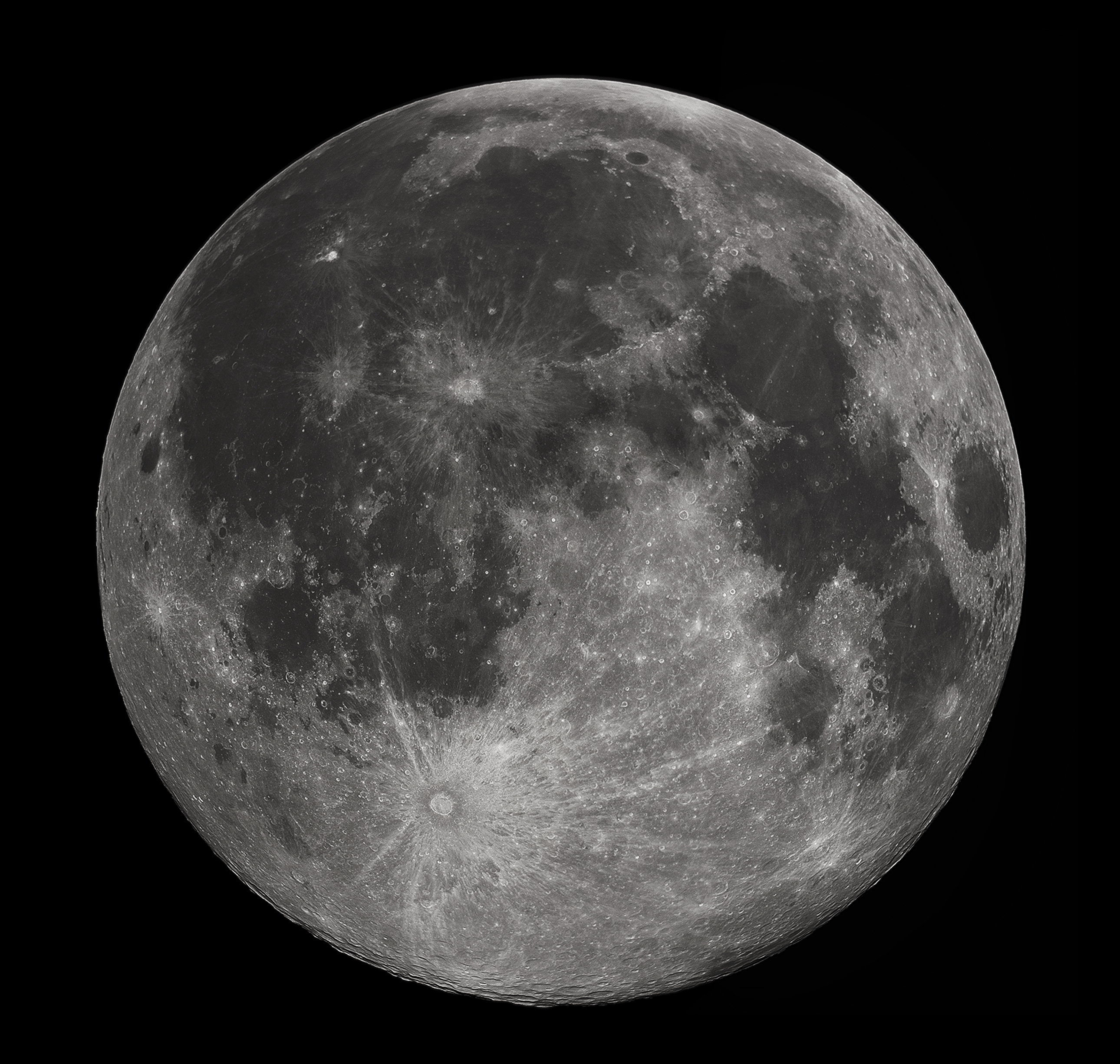
The Moon

Lunar tourism may be possible if trips to the Moon and its vicinity are made available to a private audience. Some space tourism startup companies are planning to offer tourism on or around the Moon, and estimate lunar tourism to be possible by 2043.

As of 2026, 28 humans have traveled to the lunar vicinity, and 12 have landed on the Moon; these were all astronauts on NASA's Apollo and Artemis II flights and not tourists.

== Possible attractions ==
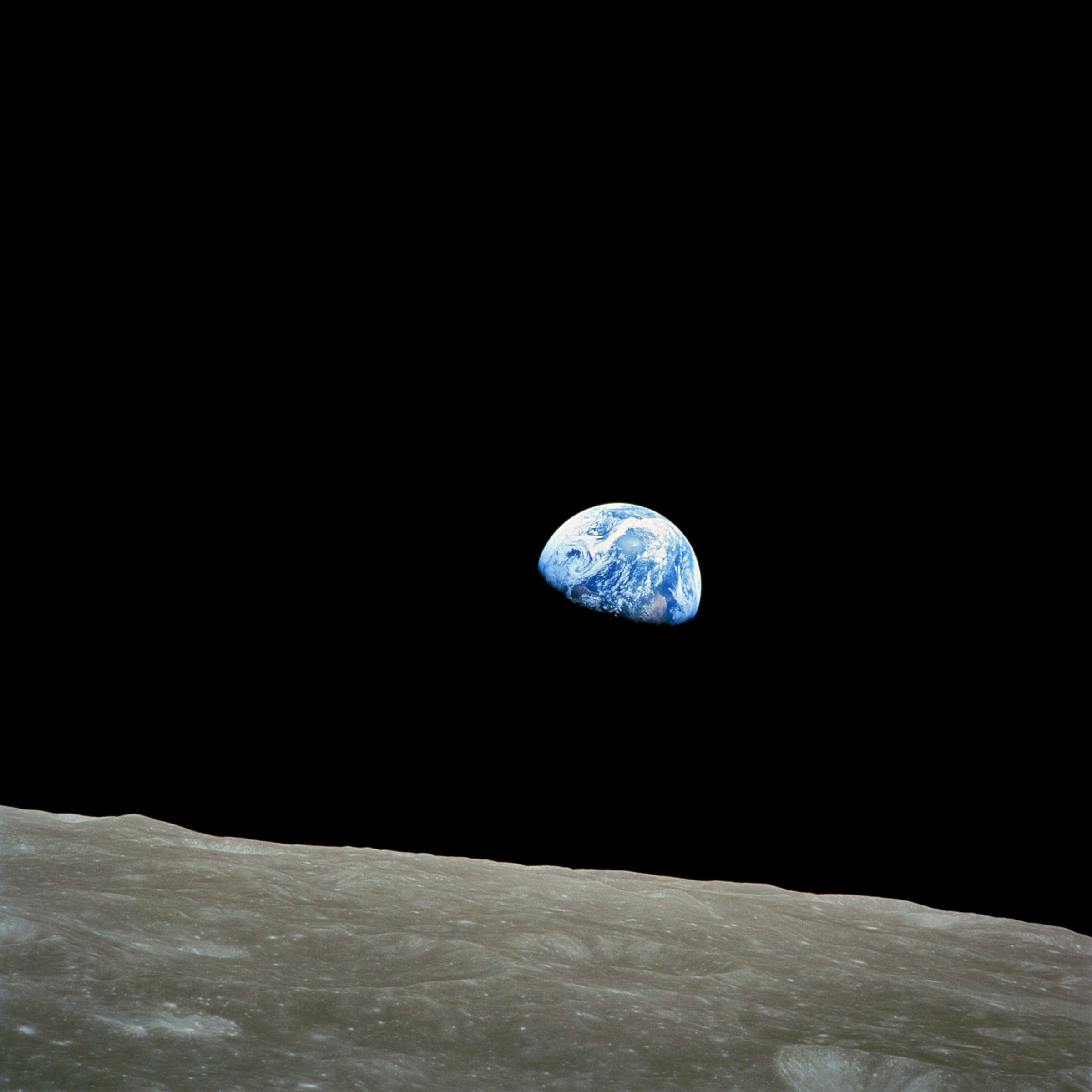
Earthrise, a 1968 photograph of the lunar horizon by Bill Anders orbiting the Moon on Apollo 8

Two natural attractions would be available by flying to the Moon's vicinity:

- View of the far side of the Moon
- View of the Earth rising and setting against the lunar horizon

When and if landing is made possible, attractions such as these have been imagined:

- Visit to helium-3 mines
- Visit to a lunar south pole habitat
- Visit to a Russian observatory
- Visit to an inflatable Moon base

== Protection of lunar landmarks ==
Buzz Aldrin's boot print on the lunar surface at Tranquility Base

The site of the first human landing on an extraterrestrial body, Tranquility Base, has been determined to have cultural and historic significance by the U.S. states of California and New Mexico, which have listed it on their heritage registers, since their laws require only that listed sites have some association with the state. Despite the location of Mission Control in Houston, Texas has not granted similar status to the site, as its historic preservation laws limit such designations to properties located within the state. The U.S. National Park Service has declined to grant it National Historic Landmark status, because the Outer Space Treaty prohibits any nation from claiming sovereignty over any extraterrestrial body. It has not been proposed as a World Heritage Site since the United Nations Educational, Scientific and Cultural Organization (UNESCO), which oversees that program, limits nations to submitting sites within their own borders. An organization called For All Moonkind, Inc. is working to develop enforceable international protocols that will manage the protection and preservation of these and other human heritage sites in outer space. For All Moonkind, Inc. will be basing their new convention on treaties such as UNESCO's World Heritage and Underwater Cultural Heritage acts. Until then, lunar tourism poses a veritable threat for heritage management, seeing as the most significant cultural sites, such as the Apollo 11 landing sites and the footprints of Aldrin and Armstrong, rely on the preservation of the surface of the Moon as is. Ideally, technologies would be developed which would allow tourists to hover over these sites without compromising the integrity of the lunar surface.

Interest in affording historical lunar landing sites some formal protection grew in the early 21st century with the announcement of the Google Lunar X Prize for private corporations to successfully build spacecraft and reach the Moon; a $1 million bonus was offered for any competitor that visited a historic site on the Moon. One team, led by Astrobotic Technology, announced it would attempt to land a craft at Tranquility Base. Although it canceled those plans, the ensuing controversy led NASA to request that any other missions to the Moon, private or governmental, human or robotic, keep a distance of at least 75 meters (246 ft) from the site. A company called PTScientists plans to return to the Taurus-Littrow Valley, the site of the Apollo 17 mission landing. PTScientists is a partner of For All Moonkind, Inc. and has pledged that its mission will honor heritage preservation and abide by all relevant guidelines.

== Types and cost ==
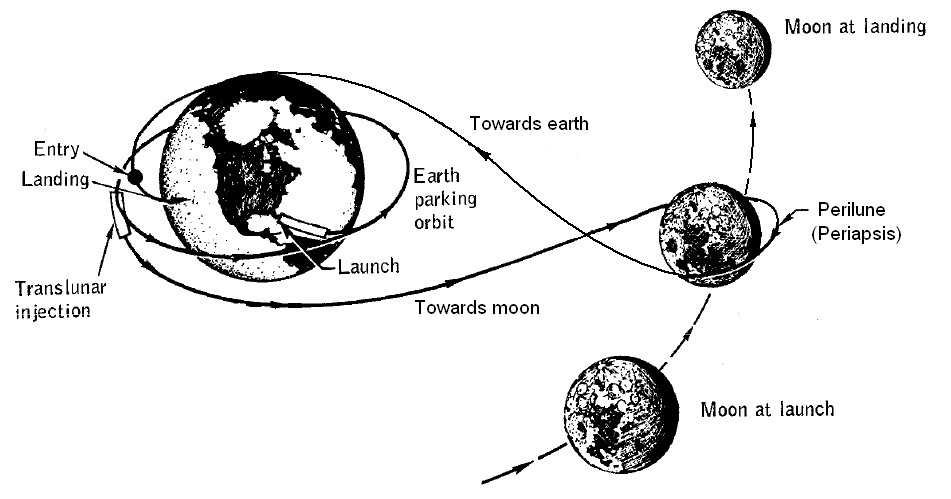
Sketch of circumlunar free return trajectory

Tourist flights to the lunar neighborhood would be of three types: flyby in a circumlunar trajectory, lunar orbit, and lunar landing.

However, the only tourist flights to space that have been successfully executed as of 2026 have been suborbital and orbital flights.

Suborbital flights are short and significantly less costly than orbital flights. Tourists on suborbital flights fly at an altitude of around 100 km, a little over the conventional beginning of space, where they get to experience zero gravity for approximately five minutes before beginning their descent back to Earth. Suborbital flights can last anywhere between 30 minutes and three hours and cost approximately $200,000 per passenger.

Orbital flights, on the other hand, are longer, more expensive, and logistically harder to realize. They require flying hundreds of kilometres above the Earth's surface. Orbital flights typically last a day and cost around $10M per passenger.

Initiatives have been announced for the commencement of commercial sub-orbital spaceline services between 2007 and 2009. The initial passenger price estimate stood at approximately $200,000, with potential price reductions of over 90% if demand rises significantly. In 2004, NASA projected that sub-orbital tourism could generate annual revenues ranging from $700 million to as much as $4 billion, representing a substantial increase compared to the 2003 commercial satellite launch market, which ranged from 100% to 600% of those figures.

Various studies have estimated the development costs of orbital passenger launch vehicles to be in the range of a few billion US dollars to around $15 billion.

Some of the space tourism start-up companies have declared their cost for each tourist for a lunar tour.

- Circumlunar flyby: Space Adventures is charging $150 million per seat, a price that includes months of ground-based training. Defunct company Excalibur Almaz had the same price tag but never managed to send their capsule to space.
- Lunar landing: The defunct Golden Spike Company charged $750 million per seat for future lunar landing tourism. The idea was for a module to be fired off into lunar orbit where it would await a crewed vehicle, linking up to it and allowing passengers to explore the lunar surface.

== Proposed missions ==
Space tourism companies which have announced they are pursuing lunar tourism include Space Adventures, Excalibur Almaz, Virgin Galactic, SpaceX, and Blue Origin, but nothing has materialized as of 2026.

- In 2005, the company Space Adventures announced a planned mission, titled DSE-Alpha, to take two tourists within 100 kilometers (54 nautical miles) of the lunar surface, using a Soyuz spacecraft piloted by a professional cosmonaut. The trip would last around a week.

=== Cancelled proposals ===
- In September 2018, SpaceX announced a mission to fly Yusaku Maezawa on a free-return trajectory around the moon, then planned for 2023. Yusaku Maezawa described the plan for his trip in further detail, dubbed the #dearMoon project, intending to take 6–8 artists with him on the journey to inspire the artists to create new art. In November 2023, the project announced that the mission had been postponed to an undecided date. After the flight was postponed indefinitely following broader Starship program delays in 2023, the project was fully cancelled on 1 June 2024.
- Excalibur Almaz proposed to take three tourists in a flyby around the Moon, using modified Almaz space station modules, in a low-energy trajectory flyby around the Moon. The trip would last around 6 months. However, their equipment was never launched and is to be converted into an educational exhibit.
- The Golden Spike Company was an American space transport startup active from 2010 to 2013. The company held the objective to offer private commercial space transportation services to the surface of the Moon. The company's website was quietly taken offline in September 2015.

== See also ==
- List of lunar features
- Commercialization of space
- Colonization of the Moon
- Free return trajectory
- Lunar resources
- NewSpace
- Space tourism
