= Rhiannon Adam =

Irish photographer

Rhiannon Adam (born 1985) is an Irish photographic artist and writer, living in London. Her books include Dreamlands, Wastelands (2014) and Big Fence / Pitcairn Island (2022). Adam was one of eight crew members for the dearMoon project, a proposed lunar tourism mission and art project.

== Early life and education ==
Adam was born in Cork, Ireland, and lives in Hackney, London. She attended Francis Holland School, Regent's Park and the University of Cambridge.

== Work ==
In 2015, she was selected for the Journey of a Lifetime programme, run by the Royal Geographical Society and BBC's Radio 4. She spent three months in the Pitcairn Islands, and drew on these experiences to create a radio piece and a book, Big Fence / Pitcairn Island (2022).

Dreamlands, Wastelands (2014) is about the seaside resorts frequented by the British, focused on Benidorm and Margate. It is made using outdated Polaroid instant film.

Adam has also published the book Polaroid: The Missing Manual, The Complete Creative Guide (2017).

In 2022, she was named as one of eight crew members on the dearMoon project, a lunar tourism mission and art project scheduled to launch aboard a SpaceX Starship in 2023. Following delays to the Starship program, the project was cancelled in 2024.

== Publications ==
=== Books ===
- Dreamlands, Wastelands. Jane & Jeremy, 2014. Edition of 100 copies.
- Polaroid: The Missing Manual, The Complete Creative Guide. Thames and Hudson, 2017. ISBN 978-0500544600.
- Big Fence / Pitcairn Island. Blow Up, 2022. With an essay by Gem Fletcher. ISBN 978-83-952840-5-2. Edition of 800 copies.

=== Other publications ===
- Big Fence / Pitcairn Island. 2018. Newspaper format. With text by Gemma Padley. Edition of 100 copies.
  - Updated edition. 2020. Edition of 100 copies.
