= Chandrashekhar (TV series) =

Indian film

- Genre: Historical drama
- Starring: Dev Joshi
- Country of origin: India
- Original language: Hindi
- No. of episodes: 110

Production
- Producer: Anirudh Pathak
- Production company: Writer's Galaxy Studios Pvt Ltd

Original release
- Network: Star Bharat
- Release: 12 March – 17 July 2018

Chandrashekhar is an Indian historical drama and biopic television series based on the life on a freedom fighter Chandra Shekhar Azad. It premiered on 12 March 2018 on Star Bharat and is produced by Anirudh Pathak.

== Cast ==
=== Main ===
- Karan Sharma as Chandra Shekhar Azad
  - Dev Joshi as Teenage Chandra Shekhar Azad
    - Ayaan Zubair Rahmani as Young Chandra Shekhar Azad
- Sneha Wagh as Jagrani Tiwari
- Satyajit Sharma as Sitaram Tiwari
- Rahul Singh as Ram Prasad Bismil
- Arjun Singh Shekhawat as Master Manohar
- Jason Shah as John Nott-Bower
- Karam Rajpal as Bhagat Singh

=== Recurring ===
- Chetanya Adib as Ashfaqulla Khan
- Vikas Shrivastav as Sachindra Bakshi
- Nikunj Nayana as Shivaram Rajguru
- Preetesh Manas as Batukeshwar Dutt
- Jaya Binju Tyagi as Durgawati Devi
- Ashish Kadian as Sukhdev Thapar
- Pankaj Singh as Manmath Nath Gupta
- Ghanshyam Garg as Tikaram
- Priya Shinde as Darsi
- Hridyansh Shekhawat as Chittu: Chandrashekar's friend

=== Guest ===
- Swati Kapoor as Harleen Kaur
- Aanjjan Srivastav as Lala Lajpat Rai
- Chirag Vohra as Mahatma Gandhi
- Aishwarya Sakhuja as Kamala Nehru
- Ram Awana as Veermal
- Prakash Ramchandani as Ramprasad's brother
- Shaize Khazmi as Bharat
