= Dev Joshi =

Indian television actor (born 2000)

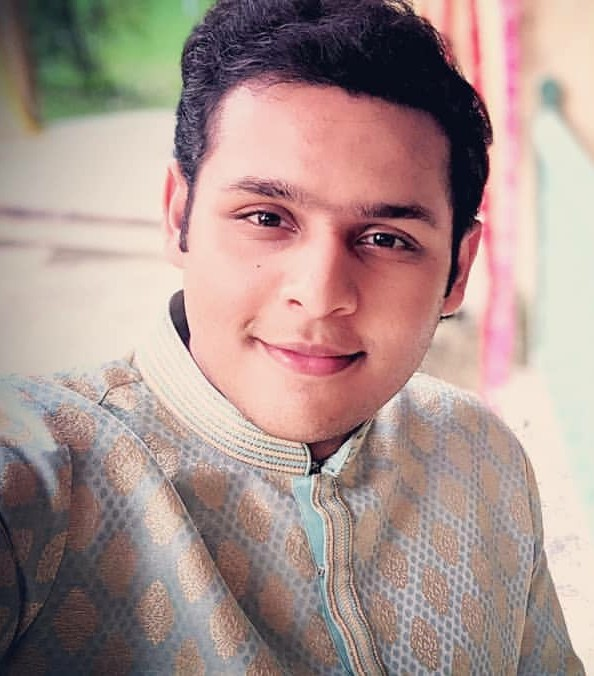
- Joshi in 2020
- Born: Dev Dushyant Kumar Joshi; 28 November 2000 (age 25); Ahmedabad, Gujarat, India
- Occupation: Actor
- Years active: 2006–present
- Known for: Baalveer
- Spouse: Aarti Kharel (m. 2025)
- Honours: Pradhan Mantri Rashtriya Bal Puraskar
- Website: www.devjoshi.in

Dev Dushyant Kumar Joshi (born 28 November 2000) is an Indian television actor known for portraying the role of Baalveer in Baalveer franchise. He has worked in more than 20 Gujarati movies and many advertisements. He is also known for playing the role of teenage Chandra Shekhar Azad in Chandrashekhar.

== Life and education ==
Dev Joshi was brought up in Ahmedabad, Gujarat with his parents Dushyant Joshi and Devangna Joshi. He attends L.D. Arts College, Ahmedabad as a student of Political Science.

On January 19, 2025, Dev Joshi became engaged to Aarti Kharel in Nepal. On February 25, 2025, he married Aarti Kharel.

== Career ==
Joshi, sometimes known as Baalveer, started acting at a young age in stage performances, theatre, advertisements and regional Gujarati shows.

He made his debut on Hindi television as Young Shukra in 2009-2010 which aired on NDTV Imagine. He also played the lead role of Young Shaurya in Kashi - Ab Na Rahe Tera Kagaz Kora in 2010.

In 2012, he was cast in the lead role for Baal Veer in Baalveer which aired on Sony SAB. After playing this role until 2016, he moved on to play teenage Chandra Shekhar Azad in Star Bharat's show Chandrashekhar. He returned to Sony SAB to play Baalveer in sequels, Baalveer Returns, Baalveer 3 and Baalveer 4.

== Proposed Spaceflight ==
Joshi applied to be a part of DearMoon project crew, the first private lunar orbital mission. In 2022, he was selected to participate with seven others who were to fly to the Moon aboard a SpaceX lunar flight. He was to be the youngest crew member and first Indian to fly around the Moon. The mission was scheduled to occur in 2023 aboard the SpaceX Starship. Citing delays to the Starship program, the dearMoon project was cancelled in 2024.

== Filmography ==
=== Television ===
Year	Title	Role	Notes	Ref.
2006–2007	Lucky	Unknown		
2009–2010	Mahima Shani Dev Ki	Young Shukra		
2009–2010	Hamari Devrani	Tejas		
2010	Kashi – Ab Na Rahe Tera Kagaz Kora	Young Shaurya		
2011	Devon Ke Dev...Mahadev	Markandeya Rishi	Cameo	
2012–2016	Baalveer	Baalveer/Ballu		
2018	Chandrashekhar	Teenage Chandra Shekhar Azad		
2019–2021	Baalveer Returns	Baalveer / Debu / Happy Pandey / Kaal		
2020	Aladdin - Naam Toh Suna Hoga	Baalveer	Cameo	
2020	Kuch Smiles Ho Jayein… With Alia	Baalveer	Cameo	
2023	Baalveer 3	Baalveer / Veer Bhardwaj / Kaalveer		
2024	Baalveer 4	Baalveer / Veer Bhardwaj / Kaalveer		
2025	Baalveer 5	Baalveer / Veer Bhardwaj / Kaalveer		

=== Music videos ===
Year	Title	Singer	Ref.
2020	Meri Hai Maa	Tarsh	
2022	Apni Yaari	Javed Ali	

== Awards ==
Year	Award	Category	Work	Ref.
2013	Indian Telly Awards	Best Child Artist (Male)	Baalveer	
2014	Indian Telly Awards	Best Child Artist (Male)	Baalveer	
2015	Indian Telly Awards	Best Child Artist (Male)	Baalveer	
