= DearMoon project =

Cancelled crewed circumlunar mission and art project

dearMoon project
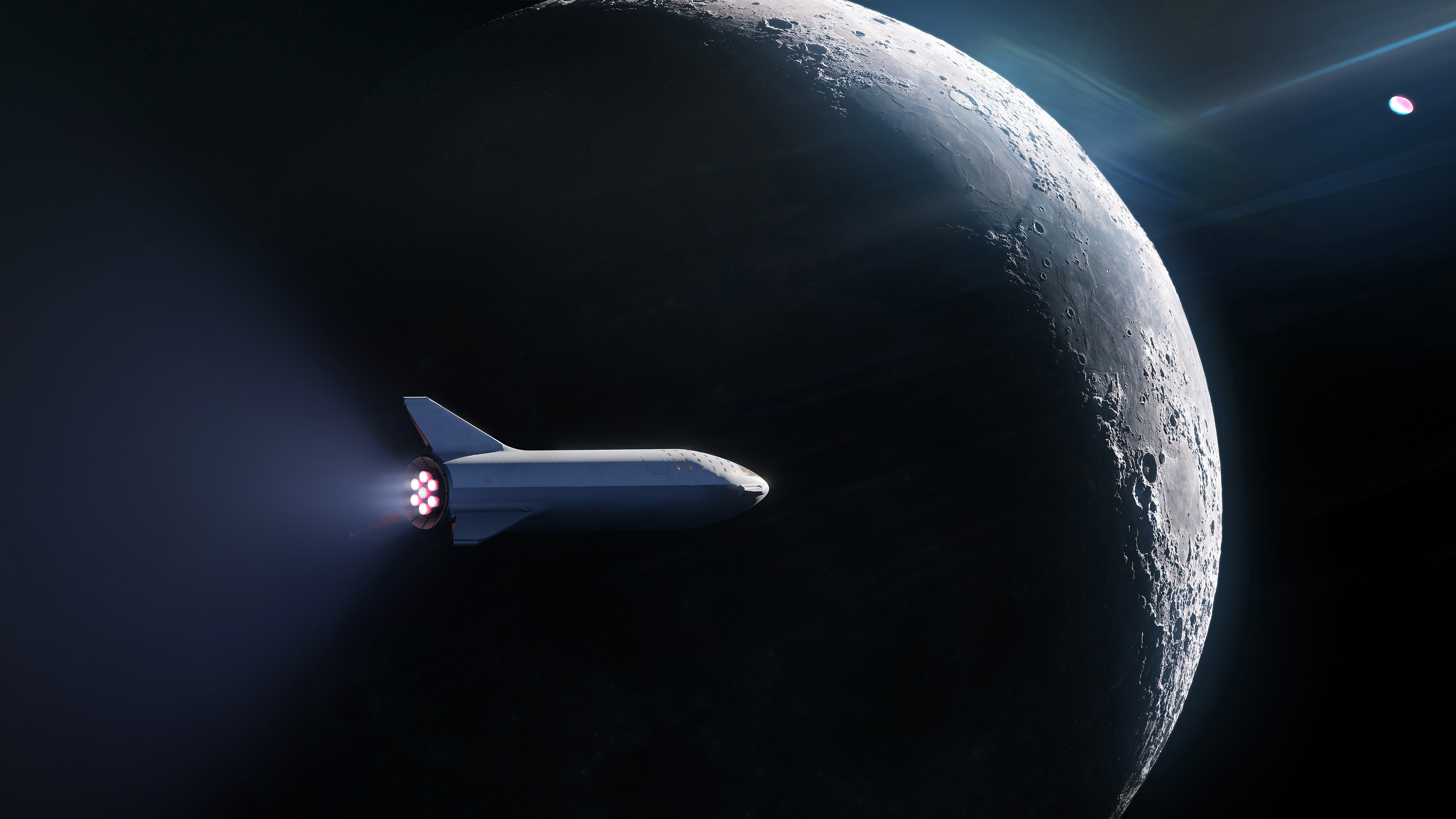
- Artistic rendition of Starship firing its engines during its lunar flyby
- Mission type: Crewed lunar flyby (cancelled)
- Operator: SpaceX
- Website: dearmoon.earth
- Mission duration: 6 days (planned)

Spacecraft properties
- Spacecraft type: Starship
- Manufacturer: SpaceX

Crew
- Crew size: 9
- Members: Yusaku Maezawa; Steve Aoki; Choi Seung Hyun; Yemi A.D. Rhiannon Adam; Tim Dodd; Karim Iliya; Brendan Hall; Dev Joshi

Start of mission
- Rocket: SpaceX Starship

End of mission
- Declared: June 2024
- dearMoon project insignia

The dearMoon project was a proposed lunar tourism mission conceived and financed by Japanese billionaire Yusaku Maezawa. It would have seen Maezawa and eight civilian artists fly a circumlunar trajectory around the Moon aboard a SpaceX Starship spacecraft.

Maezawa said he expected the experience of space tourism to "inspire the accompanying passengers in the creation of something new".

The project was unveiled in September 2018 and initially scheduled to launch in 2023. Due to delays in the development of Starship, it was delayed, then cancelled entirely in June 2024.

== History ==
On February 27, 2017, SpaceX announced that they were planning to fly two space tourists on a free-return trajectory around the Moon, now known to be billionaire Yusaku Maezawa, and one friend. This mission, which would have launched in late 2018, was planned to use the Crew Dragon capsule already developed under contract for NASA's Commercial Crew Program and launched via a Falcon Heavy rocket. As well as being a source of income for the company, any mission would serve as technology development for SpaceX's further plans to colonize Mars.

At the time of the 2017 announcement, Crew Dragon was still under development and the Falcon Heavy had yet to fly. Industry analysts noted that the schedule proposed by SpaceX might be too ambitious, as the capsule was expected to need modifications to handle differences in flight profile between the proposed lunar flight and its main use for crew transfer to space stations orbiting Earth.

In February 2018, SpaceX announced it no longer had plans to certify the Falcon Heavy for human spaceflight and that lunar missions would be flown on Starship (then called BFR). Starship is expected to have a pressurized volume of 1,000 m^{3} (35,000 ft^{3}), large common areas, central storage, a galley, and a solar storm shelter. Then, on 14 September 2018, SpaceX announced that the previously contracted passenger would be launched aboard Starship to fly by the Moon in 2023.

The project was unilaterally cancelled by Maezawa in May 2024. Starship development had fallen significantly behind the original SpaceX aspirational date for the flight in 2023—with the lunar flight likely delayed to the 2030s—and Maezawa's net worth had also halved since the time when the DearMoon venture was announced in 2018.

== Crew ==
The project was announced in 2018 with the original intent to bring a crew of artists to the Moon. In this latest release, Maezawa calls for applicants to make up a crew of eight individuals from around the world for the week-long lunar trip.

On February 7, 2019, the dearMoon YouTube channel posted a video in which Maezawa discusses the movie First Man with director Damien Chazelle and lead actor Ryan Gosling. In the video, Maezawa officially invites Chazelle to come with him on his dearMoon project, making Chazelle the first person to be publicly invited to go. However, Chazelle answered that he had to think about it and discuss it with his wife. On March 3, 2021, Yusaku Maezawa announced that eight members of the public will be selected to fly on dearMoon. On July 16, 2021, Yuzaku Maezawa uploaded a video that reveals 1 million people have joined, but there was still no information on who won the 8 seats.

On December 8, 2022, the crew of the mission was announced, along with two backup crew members.

Primary crew

Position	Astronaut
Spacecraft commander	(Japan) Yusaku Maezawa; Would have been second spaceflight
Pilot	(United States) Steve Aoki; Would have been first spaceflight
YouTuber	(United States) Tim Dodd; Would have been first spaceflight
Multidisciplinary Creative	(Czech Republic) Yemi A.D. Would have been first spaceflight
Photographic Artist	(Republic of Ireland) Rhiannon Adam; Would have been first spaceflight
Photographer	(United Kingdom) Karim Iliya; Would have been first spaceflight
Filmmaker	(United States) Brendan Hall; Would have been first spaceflight
Actor	(India) Dev Joshi; Would have been first spaceflight
Singer	(South Korea) Choi Seung-hyun; Would have been first spaceflight

Backup crew

Position	Astronaut
Mission Specialist	(United States) Kaitlyn Farrington; Would have been first spaceflight
Mission Specialist	(Japan) Miyu; Would have been first spaceflight

== Objective ==
The dearMoon project passengers would have been Yusaku Maezawa and eight accomplished artists that Maezawa had invited to travel with him for free. Maezawa expected this flight to inspire the artists in their creation of new art, which will be presented some time after their return to Earth. He had hoped this project will help promote peace around the world.

== Mission profile ==
Initially proposed to launch in 2023, the circumlunar mission was expected to have taken 6 days to complete, following a free-return trajectory similar to that of Apollo 13. NASA launched Artemis II on a similar trajectory in April 2026, with a crew of four.

== Cancellation ==
The mission was cancelled on 1 June 2024, due to Starship's developmental delays.

The cancellation was announced on the project website and on X. The cancellation notice stated "Arrangements were being made with SpaceX to target the launch by the end of 2023. Unfortunately, however, launch within 2023 became unfeasible, and without clear schedule certainty in the near-term, it is with a heavy heart that Maezawa made the unavoidable decision to cancel the project".

== See also ==
- Artemis II
- Exploration of the Moon
- List of missions to the Moon
- Polaris program
- Timeline of private spaceflight
- Tourism on the Moon
