= Aladdin – Naam Toh Suna Hoga =

2018 Indian fantasy TV series

- Also known as: Aladdin
- Genre: Fantasy; Comedy; Romance
- Created by: Alind Srivastava; Nisser Parvej
- Based on: "Aladdin and the Magic Lamp" which is associated with One Thousand and One Nights (Note: Aladdin and the Magic Lamp was written by Hanna Diyab, and was added to the One Thousand and One Nights by Antoine Galland, appearing in his French translation Les mille et une nuits.)
- Written by: Shakti Sagar Chopra; Lakshmi Jayakumar
- Screenplay by: Shivam Awasthi; Aanchal Aggarwal Vasani
- Directed by: Maan Singh; Amandeep Singh; Kushal Awasthi; Vighnesh Kamble
- Creative director: Pooja Hingorani
- Starring: Siddharth Nigam; Avneet Kaur; Ashi Singh; Aamir Dalvi; Raashul Tandon; Smita Bansal; Praneet Bhat; Gireesh Sahdev
- Theme music composer: Souvyk Chakraborty
- Opening theme: "Aladdin"
- Country of origin: India
- Original language: Hindi
- No. of seasons: 3
- No. of episodes: 572

Production
- Producers: Nissar Parvez; Alind Srivastava; Hitesh Thakkar
- Camera setup: Multi-camera
- Running time: 20–23 minutes
- Production company: Peninsula Pictures

Original release
- Network: Sony SAB; Sony LIV
- Release: 21 August 2018 – 5 February 2021

Aladdin – Naam Toh Suna Hoga (transl. Aladdin – Must've Heard The Name) is an Indian fantasy television series loosely based on the Arabian Nights story Aladdin. The series premiered on 21 August 2018 on Sony SAB. The series involves Aladdin, a kind-hearted thief, as he falls in love with Princess Yasmine, befriends a wish-granting Genie of the Lamp, and battles Zafar and later the evil enchantress Mallika, and again with Zafar after his rebirth. While it incorporates many elements from the traditional Aladdin story, such as a young thief, a genie and a princess, it deviates significantly in its narrative and character development. The show's plot introduces new story arcs, original villains, and reimagined character relationships that set it apart from the more linear Disney adaptation. The series went off-air on 5 February 2021.

== Series overview ==
No. of season	No of episodes	Originally broadcast	
No. of season	No of episodes	First aired	Last aired
1	207	21 August 2018	31 May 2019
2	250	3 June 2019	28 August 2020
3	115	31 August 2020	5 February 2021

== Plot ==
=== Season 1 ===
Mallika, an evil enchantress, tries to take over the world, but her servant Hassan betrays her and turns her into a stone statue. Before becoming a statue, Mallika turns Hassan into a genie and captures him in a lamp.

Five hundred years later, Aladdin is born in Baghdad as the only son of Ruksaar and Omar, the once royal guard of Baghdad, now termed as a traitor. Aladdin is a kind-hearted, funny, brave, courageous, and hopelessly romantic poet. He dreams to meet his childhood crush Yasmine, the Princess of Baghdad. He brings a magical lamp in exchange for ten thousand gold coins for the grand vizier of Baghdad, Zafar but gets confined in a cave. He rubs the lamp and discovers the Genie of the Lamp, naming him Ginu.

Zafar tries to steal the lamp from Aladdin but fails. Ginu lives with Aladdin disguised as a human. The Sultana puts restrictions on Yasmine, still she disguises herself as a commoner, wandering around Baghdad to address the citizens' welfare. Aladdin and Yasmine often bump into each other. The latter dislikes that Aladdin likes the princess because of her title and introduces herself as Sana. Sharing a love-hate relationship, over time, they become friends and fall in love.

Zafar finds Genie of the Ring in Misr. With the latter's help, he captures Ginu, turns him evil and erases all of his memories. He kills Sultan, frames Aladdin for the murder, and betrays Genie of the Ring by taking away all his powers. A heartbroken Yasmine reveals her truth to a perplexed Aladdin and sentences him to death.

=== Season 2 ===
One year later, Aladdin is still alive, living in Misr. Omar and Bulbul had saved him and helped him escape leading to Omar's death. Aladdin finds Genie of the Ring and discovers Zafar's crimes, seeking revenge. The duo finds two more genies – an uncle and a niece duo, Genie Meanie (Genie of the Bottle) and Chand Changezi(Genie of the Pendant).

They disguise as Ali (Aladdin), a merchant from Ankara, his siblings Sara (Genie Meanie), Chand Changezi (ChaCha), and their servant Jhumru (Anguthi Chaap) to foil Zafar's evil intentions. Gulbadan recognizes Aladdin's innocence and joins him. They try to prove Aladdin innocent, but fail. Later, Yasmine finds out about Aladdin's innocence and breaks down out of guilt. Soon she realizes Ali is Aladdin disguised and confesses her love to him, which Aladdin reciprocates. They turn Ginu back to his good form, and Aladdin is reunited with his mother.

Zafar intends to reach Mallika, the evil enchantress, with the Sonminar's help. He wants to rule the entire world, but Aladdin stops him. Zafar, with the help of his sister, Zeher, finds out Ali and Ginu's truth. Aladdin and the group bring Zafar's offenses in front of Baghdad. Zafar dies, and Zeher escapes from Baghdad. Before his death, Zafar secretly revives Mallika.

A month later, on Jashn-e-Dilbar, Aladdin proposes marriage to Yasmine, and they plan their engagement. A disguised Mallika arrives and plans for destruction by using Shaitaan ka Khanjar. She turns Aladdin's mother into the Genie of the Bracelet and persuades Aladdin to bring the three parts of the Shaitaan ka Khanjar. In a fight with Zafar's sister Zeher, Aladdin unknowingly opens a prison from which a lookalike of Zafar comes out and helps Aladdin. He introduces himself as Faraz, Zafar and Zeher's younger brother, who was imprisoned by the brother-sister duo for about 10 years. Together they collect all three parts of Shaitaan ka Khanjar by which Aladdin kills Mallika, and his mother turns back to a human.

Faraz is revealed to be Zafar, who returned, killing the real Faraz. Using the khanjar, catalyses by Mallika's blood, Zafar becomes Aiyyar Zafar. He sends Aladdin and Yasmine to bring the red box from the hell. Then, Aladdin and Yasmine reach the hell to save Omar, now an angel from punishment because he had given Aladdin a piece of the khanjar. They give the Red Box to Zafar and in return, he frees Omar from punishment. Aladdin tells Omar that the real box is with them. Omar sends it to a safer place and knowing Aladdin and Yasmine can bring it back, pushes them into lava, killing them for good and jumps himself. Zafar erases Aladdin and Yasmine's memories from the minds of Baghdad's citizens, and becomes the Sultan. He traps Ginu in his lamp, throws him away, and enslaves Genie of the Ring. Due to Aladdin's death, Chand Changezi and Geanie Meanie die in the world of Genie. Aladdin and Yasmine are reborn in Turkistan.

=== Season 3 ===
18 years later, Aladdin has grown as the spoilt, lazy prince of Turkistan and Yasmine as a kind-hearted thief. After Aladdin manages to catch her, they are banished from Turkistan and reach Baghdad after finding Ginu. After guidance from Genie of the Ring, they start taking lessons from Rukhsaar, now the principal of Baghdad's school. Aladdin tricks Zafar to discover where he has kept the memories of baghdad and turns him against Zeher. Soon, Aladdin falls for Yasmine and discovers that she was the Sultana of Baghdad. He saves her and realizes his love for her.

Aladdin reveals Zafar's wicked plans to Yasmine, and enraged, Yasmine joins hands with Aladdin to defeat Zafar and save Baghdad. He brings Zarina, a scorpion, to terminate Zafar's powers and restore the memries of Baghdad's citizens'. Zarina stings Zafar, and all the memories he had taken away are restored while she gets killed. Aladdin is reunited with his mother Rukhsaar, his namesake brothers Genie of the Ring and Ginu, and his love Yasmine. After many hurdles, Zafar and Zeher are captured and jailed. Yasmine is proclaimed the Sultana, while Zafar and Zeher manage to escape. Later, Yasmine confesses her love to Aladdin, and both get engaged. Zafar performs a ritual and tells them a meteoroid will soon crash on Earth, and the Kaala Chiragh (Black Lamp) which is present in the Red Box, can only stop that. Aladdin, Yasmine, and Zafar travel to Marakkesh to get the lamp. After a series of incidents, Zafar takes over the Black Land its and becomes the master of the Black Genie. Zafar orders him to make him Aiyyar again. Zeher enslaves Anguthi Chaap, but he sacrifices himself.

Anguthi Chaap, before his death, tells Rukhsaar that Zafar can't be killed. He locked his soul in a locket hidden in the Hell. Anguthi Chaap helps her to get there, and Rukhsaar gets the locket.Aladdin, Yasmine and Ginu battle Zafar and the black genie. Rukhsaar goes to Marakkesh to kill Zafar. Rukhsaar frees the soul from the locket, and Aladdin kills him. The Black Genie gets captured in his lamp again, but seeks revenge for his Master's death. Aladdin and Yasmine get married. The series ends with Aladdin and Yasmine ready to fight the evils of the world once again as Ginu senses a danger, since someone releases the black genie.

== Cast ==
=== Main ===
- Siddharth Nigam as
  - Aladdin/Ali Ababwa: Rukhsaar and Omar's son; Yasmine's lover-turned-husband; Ginu, Ginie of the Ring, Geanie Meanie and Chand Changezi's master and namesake brother; A kind-hearted, young and handsome boy and a hopelessly romantic poet. He was forced to be a thief, but, his life changes as he discovers Ginu. Soon, he falls for Yasmine and defeats Zafar; Reincarnated as the Prince of Turkistan. (2018–2021)
    - Om Aditya Yadav as young Aladdin (2018)
  - Haider: Aladdin's evil duplicate(2021)
- Avneet Kaur as "Sultana-e-Baghdad" Yasmine(formerly Princess Yasmine) : Shahnawaz and Mehrunissa's daughter; Aladdin's lover-turned-wife; the courageous and beautiful young princess of Baghdad, who roams as a commoner assuring the welfare of her citizens. She is crowned as the Sultana after Zafar's defeat; Reincarnated as an orphan. (2018–2020)
  - Ashi Singh replaced Kaur as Yasmine. (2020–2021)
- Aamir Dalvi as
  - Zafar: Zeher and Faraz's brother; A nefarious, deceptive, treacherous usurper and a power-hungry sorcerer; the Grand Vizier of Baghdad, who betrays the Sultan and seeks the throne of Baghdad; He became the master of the black genie, but still met his demise at Aladdin's hands. (2018–2021)
  - Zafar, Faraz and Zeher's father (illusion) (2019)
- Raashul Tandon as Hassan-Ul-Rahman-Bin-Tughluq/Ginu/Genie of the Lamp: Genie of the Ring's younger brother; Geanie Meanie's love-interest; a comical and kindly genie who has the power to grant wishes to whoever possesses his magic lamp. Aladdin considers him his brother and calls him Ginu. (2018–2021)
- Smita Bansal as Rukhsaar: Omar's widow; Aladdin's mother; a kind-hearted woman who never held grudges even to those who are cruel to her. She is detested by the people of Bhaghdad due to his husband's alleged traitorship. (2018–2021)
- Praneet Bhat as Hussan-Ul-Rahman-Bin-Tughluq/Genie of the Ring/Anguthi Chaap: Ginu's elder brother, a genie found in Misr by Zafar. He helps Zafar in his wicked plans, but joins Aladdin as the former betrays him.(2019–2021)
- Gireesh Sahdev as Omar: Mustafa's elder brother; Rukhsaar's husband; Aladdin's father; The former trusted army chief of the Sultan, who was falsely termed as a traitor by Zafar years ago and went away thinking that her pregnant wife was dead, as the angry mob put his house on fire. (2018–2020)

=== Recurring ===
- Nausheen Ali Sardar as Mallika: the evil enchantress, who was turned into stone by Hassan, before which she turned Hassan and Hussan into genies. She gets resurrected by Zafar, but is killed by Aladdin.(2018)
  - Debina Bonnerjee replaced Sardar as Mallika (2020)
- Divyangana Jain as "Sultana-e-Baltish" Zeher-un-Nissa: Zafar and Faraz's sister; a powerful toxicologist who could make any dangerous venom and helps Zafar to discover Aladdin's truth and deceitfully obtain Shaitan ka Khanjar. She accidentally dies due to her own poison attempting to kill Aladdin. (2019–2021)
- Vikas Grover as Gulbadan: the former Grand Vizier of Baghdad and Aladdin's cousin, an innocent and kind-hearted person who helps Aladdin to save Baghdad. (2018–2020)
- Sonal Bhojwani as Geanie-Meanie/Sarah/Genie of the Bottle: Chand Changezi's niece; Ginu's love-interest; A mermaid-shaped genie, who has the ability to freeze time for 30 seconds. She helps Aladdin to defeat Zafar. She dies as Aladdin dies with her magic bottle, when she goes to the Genie world to pray. (2019–2020)
- Krishang Bhanushali as Chand Changezi "ChaCha"/Genie of the Pendant: a 1,500-year-old genie but is able to take the form of a seven-year-old child and can transform into any object. He dies as Aladdin dies with his magic pendant, when he goes to the Genie world to pray. (2019–2020)
- Gulfam Khan as Nazneen Begum: Mustafa's wife; Gulbadan's mother; Aladdin's aunt; A greedy woman who always collaborates with the antagonist whether Zafar or Mallika. She forces Aladdin to thieve to let him and her mother stay in a room on rent; Later, a cook in the Shahi Talimghar and also a small thief along with her husband. (2018–2020)
- Badrul Islam as Mustafa: Omar's younger brother; Nazneen's husband; Gulbadan's father, Aladdin's uncle; A comical person who always works with Nazneen in her selfish motives; Later, a cook in Talimghar and also a small thief along with his wife. (2018–2020)
- Chayan Trivedi as Bulbul aka Bulbul Chacha: Omar and Mustafa's cousin; Aladdin and Gulbadan's uncle; Chulbul's grandfather. He is a scientific inventor, who helps Aladdin with his various tasks by giving him his new inventions. He is killed by Zafar. (2018–2020)
- Gyan Prakash as Sultan Shahnawaz: Mehrunissa's husband, Yasmine's father; the Sultan of Baghdad. He loves her daughter and wants to make her a good leader. He is killed by Zafar. (2018–2020)
- Jhuman: Shahnawaz's lookalike. (2018)
- Farhina Parvez as Piddi: Yasmine's loyal handmaiden and friend; Aladdin's friend and former secret admirer; She often comforts Yasmine whenever she is upset. (2018–2019)
- Yashu Dhiman as Mallika Begum Mehrunisa: Shahnawaz's widow; Yasmine's mother; The former Queen of Baghdad. She puts restrictions on Yasmine and asks her to get married and drop the idea of being a Sultana. Later, she helps Yasmine to take care of the people of Baghdad. (2018–2019)
- Prakhar Saxena as Subedar Akbar: Zafar's former right hand, who was deceitfully killed by him. (2018–2020)
- Sonal Kaushal as Shaheen(voice): Reincarnated Yasmine's talking parrot; her best friend and sister-figure; She has a unique sense of humor and a unique style of talking. She talks a lot, thus gaining the nickname "Chatar-Patar". (2020–2021)
- Amit Raghuvanshi as Sheefan: Koyal's brother; Reincarnated Yasmine's admirer; One of the students of Rukhsaar; He is jealous of Shehzada Aladdin and creates problems for him and Ginu as he likes Yasmine. (2020)
- Shivani Badoni as Koyal: Sheefan's sister; Reincarnated Aladdin's admirer; A student of Rukhsaar; She likes Aladdin very much and genuinely cares for everyone. (2020)
- Soni Singh as Zarina: a shapeshifter, kind-hearted, orphan female scorpion and reincarnated Aladdin's sister-figure; She falls in love with Zafar but gets stabbed by him. Before dying, she stings Zafar which leads to the removal of all dark powers from Zafar, thus freeing the memories of Baghdad's citizens. (2020)
- Karan Khan as Chulbul: Bulbul Chacha's grandson; A scientific inventor like his grandfather, an aid to Rukhsar and Aladdin. (2020–2021)
- Jogesh as Khalibali: A therian guard; He guards the Talimghar as per Zafar's orders. (2020–2021)
- Tushar Kawale as Badal: Bijli's brother; Zafar's brother-in-law. Zafar threw him off a cliff for failing to claim the lamp. (2018)
- Ritu Singh as Bijli: Badal's sister; Zafar's sister-in-law. Zafar threw her off a cliff for failing to claim the lamp. (2018)
- Shweta Khanduri as Aliza: a manipulative harridan killed by Ginu. (2018)
- Nithish as Prince Anders: a courageous and handsome young Prince from Skanland; Yasmine's former suitor (2019)
- Chahat Pandey as Meher: Shahnawaz's niece; Yasmine's cousin; the princess of Yemen. She has a crush on Aladdin, making Yasmine jealous. (2019)
- Shrashti Maheshwari as Gulegulfam: Gulbadan's haughty wife who goes away to her mother's house. (2019)
- Vinit Kakar as Haiwan-e-Hiblish: the wicked demon who contaminates the water using his toxic venom. (2019)
- Pal John as "Sultana-e-Misr" Adaya: a stubborn young sultana regnant and Aladdin's former fiancée; She helps Aladdin by giving him Atish-e-Aftab. (2019)
- Harsh Vashisht as "Sultan-e-Turkistan" Firoz : Reincarnated Aladdin's father; a dutiful and fair Sultan and a strict father who wants to help Prince Aladdin find the right path. (2020)
- Guneet Sharma as Shiraz: Prince Aladdin's close friend. (2020)
- Vipul Tyagi as Faiz: a sidekick of Prince Aladdin who helps him in his mischief. (2020)
- Aradhana Sharma as "Sultana-e-Aqaba" Tamanna: a mysterious sultana regnant who is a cat-woman and also knows magic. She is given the duty by Omar to guard the second part of Shitan Ka Khanjar, but Aladdin somehow takes it with him. (2020)
- Kajal Jain as Mehjabeen: a witch, who was Zafar's ex-fiancé and was killed by him years ago; She comes out due to a task given by Rukhsaar to Shehzaada Aladdin and his team to take the magic lantern. She is killed by Zeher (2020)
- Viren Singh Rathore as Allah Rakha: Omar's friend and a protector of truth who is approached by Rukhsaar to get help for Aladdin and other children of Talimghar from Zafar. He fights with Zafar but gets killed due to Zeher's poison. (2020)
- Hetvi Sharma as Sunahari: a little girl rescued by Yasmine from the gang of Zafar. Now, she resides along with Yasmine in the Talimghar. (2020)
- Anila K Kharbanda as Roothi: A fairy, who helps Zafar watch the past of reincarnated Aladdin and Yasmine. (2020)
- Riddhi Gupta as Jhoothi: A fairy, who helps Zafar watch the past of reincarnated Aladdin and Yasmine. (2020)
- Prerika Arora as Tooti: A fairy, who helps Zafar watch the past of reincarnated Aladdin and Yasmine. (2020)
- Milan Singh as Zehreeli: a naagin (shape-shifter female serpent), who has the power to see the future. (2020–2021)
- Nirisha Basnett as Sheherzaadi: Black genie's daughter; a powerful author and an aid to Zafar; She is able to trap people in her dark story and create new characters in her story which happens in reality. She is trapped by Aladdin in her own story. (2021)
- Krishna Kant Singh Bundela as Fakir
- Mir Mustafa: Omar’s friend, held captive for 20 years and killed by Zafar. (2019)

=== Guest ===
- Dev Joshi as Baalveer from Baalveer Returns.
- Vansh Sayani as Vivaan from Baalveer Returns.
- Pavitra Punia as Timnasa from Baalveer Returns.
- Aditya Ranvijay as Bhaymar from Baalveer Returns.
- Priya Sharma as Nagini from Baalveer Returns.

== Crossover ==
Aladdin – Naam Toh Suna Hoga had a crossover with Baalveer Returns from 27 January 2020 to 31 January 2020.

== Awards ==
Year	Award	Category	Recipient	Ref
2018	Indian Television Academy Awards	Best Actor in a Negative Role	Aamir Dalvi	
2018	Indian Television Academy Awards	Best Actor	Siddharth Nigam	
2019	Gold Awards	Debut in a Lead Role (Female)	Avneet Kaur	
2019	Gold Awards	People's Favourite TV Actor	Siddharth Nigam	
