= Baalveer =

Indian television series

- Genre: Fantasy
- Created by: Vipul D. Shah; Mayank Vohra
- Written by: Amit Senchoudhary
- Screenplay by: Rohit Malhotra
- Directed by: Maan Sing; Thusar Bhatia; Kushal Awasthi; Sanjay Satavase
- Starring: See below
- Composers: Lenin Nandi; Souvyk Chakraborty
- Country of origin: India
- Original language: Hindi
- No. of seasons: 5
- No. of episodes: 1,673

Production
- Executive producer: Rajan Singh
- Producers: Vipul D. Shah; Sanjeev Sharma
- Cinematography: Pushpank Gawade
- Editor: Hemant Kumar
- Camera setup: Multi-camera
- Running time: 16—41 minutes
- Production company: Optimystix Entertainment

Original release
- Network: Sony SAB; SonyLIV
- Release: 8 October 2012 – 9 May 2025

Baalveer is an Indian fantasy television series and the longest-running speculative fiction television series in India. The franchise stars Dev Joshi in the titular role.

Its first season aired from 8 October 2012 to 4 November 2016.

The second season, titled Baalveer Returns, aired from 10 September 2019 to 30 June 2021. It is a direct sequel to the first season.

The third season, titled Baalveer 3, aired from 18 March 2023 to 9 September 2023. It is a spiritual sequel to Baalveer Returns.

The fourth season, titled Baalveer 4, ran from 6 May 2024 to 23 July 2024 on SonyLIV. It is a direct sequel to Baalveer 3.

A fifth season titled Baalveer 5 aired from 7 April 2025 to 10 May 2025 on SonyLIV. It is a direct sequel to Baalveer 4.

== Series overview ==
Series	Title	Episodes	Originally released		
Series	Title	Episodes	First released	Last released	Network
1	Baalveer	1,111	8 October 2012	4 November 2016	Sony SAB
2	Baalveer Returns	354	10 September 2019	30 June 2021	Sony SAB
3	Baalveer 3	104	18 March 2023	9 September 2023	Sony SAB
4	Baalveer 4	57	6 May 2024	23 July 2024	SonyLIV
5	Baalveer 5	47 (Note: The episode numbering of Baalveer 5 continues from Baalveer 4, starting at episode 58 instead of restarting from episode 1, making a total of 104 episodes across both seasons.)	7 April 2025	9 May 2025	SonyLIV

== Plot ==
=== Baalveer ===
The story revolves around Pari Lok (the Fairy Realm), where good fairies reside, each possessing unique abilities. Rani Pari is the queen of the fairies, while Bhayankar Pari, an evil fairy, plots to create terror on Earth. She seeks revenge as she wasn't given the throne by Maa Pari, when she was a good fairy. Rani Pari assigns different fairies to protect specific locations on Earth from Bhayankar Pari's evil plans, but in vain.

Consequently, Rani Pari decides to give powers to Baalveer to fight with the evil. Years ago, he was born in Rajasthan with Pari-Tara's powers. Bhayankar Pari tried to abduct him, but Rani Pari stopped her. In a series of events, Baalveer was saved and carried to Pari Lok by Baalpari. Ranipari identified him and permitted Baalpari to raise him in Parilok. In the present, Rani Pari grants him the power of seven fairies, known as Saptapari, along with her own powers to aid him in his mission. An upright man named Mahesh Dagli adopts Baalveer, when he's sent to Earth. Baalveer becomes known as Ballu and is embraced by Mahesh's family -the Saat Sachhon ka Parivar (Family of seven who never lies), who are unaware of his true identity.

The series features multiple confrontations between Baalveer and Bhayankar Pari, who attempts to spread evil in Pari Lok and Earth. Despite various challenges, Baalveer emerges victorious with the help of fairies. Later, Chhal Pari tries to kill Baalveer, but ends up killing Rani Pari. A new Rani Pari emerges to guide Baalveer and fairies.

Bhayankar Pari is eventually killed by Baalveer and new evil fairies are introduced throughout the show. Numerous battles take place to uphold peace and righteousness. The story concludes with the triumph of good over evil, restoring peace and harmony in both Pari Lok and Earth, as Baalveer returns to Pari Lok from Earth.

=== Baalveer Returns ===
Timnasa, an evil enchantress and the queen of Kaal Lok, begins a quest to rule the whole universe and become the most powerful and evil entity. She attacks and destroys the Pari Lok. Baalveer and the surviving fairies take refuge in Pari Lok's sister-planet Veer Lok, whose leader is a white lion, Shaurya. Baalveer becomes weaker due to his injuries in the attack. On Shaurya's instructions, Baalveer goes to Earth as Dev, with the fairies as his sisters, to find his successor, as he needs help to fight Timnasa.

Baalveer's successor is a very mischievous 10-year-old boy named Vivaan. Initially, Baalveer and Vivaan dislike each other, but soon, Baalveer finds out that Vivaan is his successor and discloses his reality to him and takes him to Veer Lok. Timnasa turns Baal Pari into evil Kaal Pari to stop Vivaan's Veer-Tilak. Baalveer manages to get Baal Pari's wand and instates Vivaan as his successor. The duo heroically spoils all of Timnasa's evil plans. Soon, Baalveer and Vivaan start loving and taking care of each other.

Baalveer finds Sarvakaal's prison and Timnasa's past, about how she was banished from Pari Lok years ago by Baal Pari, because of her evil and egoistic intentions. Baalveer fakes losing his memories and lives as Vivaan's brother Debu with him, as instructed by Shaurya. He acquires a new avatar, Naqabposh and befriends Ananya, a girl who is threatened by Timnasa, and also receives help from Sarvakaal. They together go to Earth to find the hidden power which is destined to kill Timnasa. Consequently, it is revealed that Vivaan is Ananya's long-lost brother, and their biological mother is Devaki, the former queen of Shwet Lok, which was destroyed by Timnasa and was made Kaal Lok by her. The trio forms 'Team Shadow' and Vivaan, being the hidden power destined to kill Timnasa, gains Sarvakaal's infinite energy. By this new power, he puts an end to Timnasa's trinity except for Tauba Tauba. During the battle, Masti Pari is killed by Bhaymar, and Vayu Pari and Jwala Pari sacrifice themselves as Timnasa's weapons hit them, to protect the Earth.

Later, when Debu opens the secret message of Timnasa, which she had handed over to him before her death, Timnasa's spirit tells Debu that his biological parents were killed by Shaurya and the fairies. Baalveer cures Baal Pari from Timnasa's magic, but Shaurya persuades her to refrain from revealing the truth.

The series unveils the underwater kingdom of Shinkai, which is ruled by Jalraj Kaikos. The commander-in-chief Bambaal plots to rule over the whole universe, along with his sidekick Milsa. Baalveer captures Milsa, but Bambaal secretly kills her to hide his identity from Debu and Vivaan. Ray's full powers are unleashed by Debu's blood after he threatens Vivaan's life. It is revealed that Baalveer is Jaikaas' son and Ray's twin-brother, born in 2000. Jaikaas was a lunatic scientist of Veer Lok, who planned to destroy Earth by 2020, but was deceptively killed by Shaurya while escaping and Baalveer fell to Rajasthan, where a couple adopted him and later Bhayankar Pari tried to abduct him prompting Rani Pari's interruption. Eventually, Baal Pari carried him to Pari Lok, while Shaurya managed to justify himself. Bambaal, using Baalveer's troubled past, tries to turn him against Shaurya, but enraged, he captures Bambaal and kills him. Ray kills Baalveer out of anger. Later, Baalveer comes back to life as he and Vivaan went through a test of destiny. Ray creates problems for the duo and revives Bhaymar, Timnasa, and Akroor to revenge Bambaal and Milsa's deaths.

Timnasa plots to destroy the earth by attaining the ultimate power, a red diamond. Baalveer, Vivaan and the fairies battle against Timnasa to get the diamond to protect Earth. However, Timnasa deceitfully manages to obtain it. Baalveer manages to find the white magical diamond and sacrifices himself by joining the two diamonds, leading to a terrifying explosion leading to his and Timnasa's death, leaving their souls destroyed.

A new character, Happy, is introduced, who is a lookalike of Baalveer. Kaal, another lookalike of Baalveer with evil intentions who was imprisoned by Swarna Shaurya centuries ago and kept frozen as a statue in Drak Lok gets freed from prison. Baalveers's energy star divides into 6 pieces and entres the body of the 6 lookalikes of Baalveer, which helps Kaal to escape from prison. He decides to kill other lookalikes of himself. Happy tries to administer his newfound powers. Kaal manages to kill a lookalike and gets his powers.

Later, Happy and his family visit Bharat Nagar to conduct wedding of Diwali's relative. The residents of Bharat Nagar are shocked to see Happy, lookalike of Debu, and get emotional assuming him as Debu. However, it is revealed to them that Happy is just a lookalike of Debu. Ray and Bhaymar doubt Happy to be Baalveer and plan to disclose the same. In Drak Lok, the seven Shauryas manage to safeguard remaining three lookalikes of Baalveer at a secret place, but Kaal finds them and manages to kill another lookalike of Baalveer and gain his powers. Happy tries to control his mind and powers. The fairies and Vivaan try to collect energies of seven Shauryas from seven universes to defeat Kaal and try to save the remaining lookalikes.

=== Baalveer 3 ===
A spiritual sequel to the previous seasons, this season unravels the story of another universe. The plot is central to the Baalveer of this universe, who is preparing for his mother, Adishi's arrival in Udaka Lok after her two months' journey. He goes to Earth to buy a gift for her and saves a girl named Kaashvi from an accident. In Udaka-Lok, Baalveer passes a test set by Uttan, the ruler of Shaashvan-Lok, and is declared worthy. However, Aageel plans to kill Baalveer using her Mahajadoo.

Kaashvi’s mother is revealed to be Tuyeer, a trusted ally of Aageel. When Aageel attacks Kaashvi, her Mahajadoo is absorbed inside her (as she is the offspring of two different species). Aageel captures Kaashvi and takes her to Himbaash to extract her Mahajadoo, but she is eventually saved by her parents who then safely sends her to Earth. In a series of events, Baalveer is charged guilty for Babel and Tuyeer’s death and thereby is stripped off his memories and powers until the investigation to the matter is completed. Until then, he is sent to Earth via Bardol, a secret agent of Shaashvaan Lok, to lead a new life.

Bardol entrusts Bhaskar Bhardwaj, a magician, to take care of Baalveer until the matter is sorted. Thus, Baalveer begins to live a new life as "Veer Bhardwaj", befriends Kaashvi, after certain bickerings, and furthermore vows to bring an end to the financial problems of his new family.

Veer's memories and powers temporarily return unknowingly via Kaashvi’s help, and under the guidance of "Benaam", Veer regains his superhero identity and soughts to find clues to prove his innocence to Uttan, but in vain. Meanwhile, Shashmaag releases the soul of a devilish witch named "Kurja" and transmits her into Adishi’s body with the objective of escaping from Uttan’s suspicion and to kill Baalveer. Meanwhile, Aageel’s futile attempts of killing Baalveer by manipulating Kaashvi triggers the negative traits of the latter frequently. Simultaneously, Veer and Kaashvi’s bond continues to develop.

Adishi (controlled by Kurja) meets Baalveer and commands him to surrender, to which he refuses. In a set of dramatic twists, she is apparently killed and the blame of the same is put on Baalveer by Shashmaag to instigate Uttan. Although Benaam catches hold of Kurja’s soul, Shashmaag kills the latter in the nick of time.

An angered Uttan soughts to destroy "B", the power source of Baalveer to put an end to his life. However, Baalveer manages to overpower him and preserves "B" safely with himself. In a set of thrilling twists and turns, Baalveer ultimately finds out about Shashmaag’s duality and finally proves his innocence to Mahamahim, who then remorsefully captures and kills Shashmaag with the help of his twin brother, Nehmaag. However, Shashmaag exchanged places with Nehmaag in the nick of time and took his guise, without gaining anyone’s suspicion.

Meanwhile, Aageel poses as "Agni", a righteous protector who then instigates Kaashvi against Baalveer and provokes her into believing that the latter is responsible for her parents’ death. Thus, Kaashvi vows revenge by killing off Baalveer with the help of her newly found powers. She is devastated and hurt to know that Veer is Baalveer, and consequently attacks him in a rough battle at the solar eclipse (when her powers are at par). However, both of them effectively solve the misunderstandings and a regretful Kaashvi eventually reconciles with Veer, only to realise that the Mahajadoo inside her is steadily weakening her survival like a poison.

With the help of Benaam and Kaashvi, Baalveer subsequently manages to extract Mahajadoo from the former’s body, thus making her safe. While Shashmaag joins hands with Aageel to seek revenge, Baalveer eventually finds out that Benaam is his real biological mother, and on being tricked by Aageel, he soughts to free his father, Bhasma, from Krinkaal Lok. He successfully frees his father after overcoming various problems. But, Bhasma, starts destroying the world which angers Uttan. Baalveer promises to return, after realising his mistakes, with greater powers, to save the world.

=== Baalveer 4 ===
Baalveer successfully frees his father, Bhasma, from Krinkaal Lok, unaware that he is a villain. Bhasma starts destroying the world. Then, Baalveer makes Bhasma faint. Benam tells Baalveer about his past: Bhasma was initially a soldier of Shashwan Lok, but he wanted to rule the world. So, he pretended to be in love with Benam and married her. Then Baalveer kills his father with Bhasm trident at last, but a new enemy named Param, who has already killed 49 different Baalveers of the universe, is trying to kill this last Baalveer. But to complete the Baliduar Vidhy and fill his powers, he first kills Baalveer's mother Benam and then Mahamahim Uttan.

=== Baalveer 5 ===
Baalveer is confronted by a powerful new enemy named Param, who has a mysterious connection to him and has already eliminated Baalveers across multiple universes. Param's sole mission is to destroy the current Baalveer. Adding to Baalveer's struggles, he is dealing with the emotional fallout of a difficult confrontation with his father, leaving him feeling powerless. While, on the other hand Kaashvi and Vivaal set out to kill Ageel but got failed when Ageel regains her powers and vows to kill Vivaal. On the other hand, Tauba Tauba decides to burn Dada Ji's body but gets failed. While, Shashmaag who is pretending to be Nehmaag joins hands with Param. Later, Shashmaag shows his real identity to Baalveer's friends. Baalveer's friends' souls get captured by Param. Baalveer decides to save them. Ageel shows her power parts to Andher and Timira. She tells both that if one of them kill Vivaal she will give them powers. Later, Andher, Timira and Tauba Tauba set out to kill Vivaal. After continuous fights, Baalveer along with the help of other 49 Baalveers' powers finally defeats and kills Param. Then Baalveer and his mother Benaam come to Himbash lok and together they defeat and kill Ageel resulting in the destruction of Ageel's powers and her palace. Then Baalveer and Kashvi finally reunite indirectly confessing their love for each other, concluding the series.

== Cast ==
=== Main ===
- Dev Joshi as:
  - Baalveer / Ballu / Dev/ Debu/ Naqabposh: Baal Pari's adopted son; Vivaan's brother-figure; Jaikaas' biological son; Ray's estranged twin brother; Ananya's love interest; Saviour of the Earth.(2012–2016, 2019–2021)
  - Baalveer / Veer Bhardwaj : Benaam and Bhasm’s biological-son; Adishi's adopted-son; Saviour of the Earth in another universe (2023, 2024, 2025)
  - Happy Pandey, a happy-go-lucky guy from Kanpur, a lookalike of Baalveer who got 1/6th of his powers after his death. (2021)
  - Kaal: an evil lookalike of Baalveer from Drak Lok who gets 1/6th portion of his powers and wants to kill the other lookalikes to obtain all the powers of Baalveer. (2021)
  - Joshi also portrayed many lookalike of Baalveer including Prince Dorza (2016), four lookalike from different universes who were kidnapped by Kaal (2021) and Kaalveer, an evil shadow-lookalike of Baalveer created from the dark energy of the Manthan Kua. (2025)
- Sharmilee Raj as
  - Baal Pari: Baalveer's adoptive mother; One of the Saptapari; Later, Rani Pari's successor; a fairy in Pari Lok who has the power of tresses and curls. She is the senior most fairy after Rani Pari and takes decisions in her absence. In the later season, she succeeds Rani Pari as Pari Lok's ruler. (2012-2016, 2019-2021)
  - Benaam: Baalveer's biological-mother; Bhasm’s wife. She helps Veer in recollecting his true identity and proving his innocence. (2023, 2024, 2025)
- Anushka Sen as Meher Dagli: Smita and Mahesh's daughter; Manav's sister; Later, she becomes Baal Sakhi after receiving powers from the fairies and helps Baalveer. (2012–2016)
- Rudra Soni as Manav Dagli: Smita and Mahesh's son; Meher's brother; Later, he becomes Baal Mitra after receiving powers from the fairies and helps Baalveer. (2012–2016)
- Karishma Tanna as Rani Pari (initially Bahuroopi Pari): Pari Lok's supreme ruler; Maa Pari's successor. She controls the forces of righteousness and guides the fairies and Baalveer. She dies while saving Baalveer from Chhal Pari. (2012–2013)
  - Shruti Seth replaced Tanna as Rani Pari (2013)
- Shama Sikander as Bhayankar Pari: She was formerly Bhali Pari but she becomes resentful of the fairies and Maa Pari when she is not given the throne, so she goes away and creates Bhayanak Lok. She wants revenge on Rani Pari and Baalveer for her defeat but is eventually killed by Baalveer. (2012–2014)
  - Shweta Kawatra replaced Sikander as Bhayankar Pari. (2014–2015)
- Sudeepa Singh as Rani Pari: Bahuroopi Pari's successor; She becomes the new queen of Pari Lok after the previous Rani Pari dies. (2014–2016)
- Vansh Sayani as Vivaan: Baalveer's successor and brother-figure; Devaki and Adityapratap's biological son; Karuna's adopted son; Ananya's brother; Khushi's adoptive brother; Abandoned at Karuna's door by his father after Timnasa's attack, Vivaan grows as a mischievous and brave boy. Later, he receives powers, helps Baalveer and develops a close bond with him. (2019–2021)
- Pavitra Punia as Timnasa: Kaal Lok's evil enchantress; She vows to take revenge for her banishment from Pari Lok by killing Baalveer. After many futile attempts, she dies along with Baalveer. (2019–2020, 2021)
- Aditya Ranvijay as
  - Bhaymaar, the loyal warlord of Dark Realm. He always competes with Timnasa to take over the throne of Kaal Lok by defeating Baalveer and Vivaan. (2019–2021)
  - Shashmaag: Uttan's assistant; Nehmaag’s twin brother. He started to pose as Nehmaag thereafter and joins hands with Aageel. (2023, 2024, 2025)
  - Nehmaag: Shashmaag’s righteous twin brother. He was killed by Shashmaag and his identity was taken over by the former. (2023)
- Anahita Bhooshan as Ananya/Karigar Pari: a gymnast and resident of Bharat Nagar Society; Devaki and Adityapratap's daughter; Vivaan's elder sister; Baalveer's friend; She was trapped by Timnasa, but later joins Baalveer and Vivaan. She becomes a fairy with the power to create anything by drawing in the air. (2020–2021)
- Shoaib Ali as Ray: Jaikaas' son; Baalveer's estranged twin brother; Trapped for 20 years in a conical egg created by Jaikaas, he breaks free and teams up with Bambaal and later Timnasa to kill Baalveer. (2020–2021)
- Aditi Sanwal as Kaashvi Sahay: Tuyeer and Babel's daughter; Baalveer's friend. (2023, 2024, 2025)
- Ada Khan as Aageel: Himbaash-Lok's evil empress. She plans to kill Baalveer to establish her reign across the universe and joins hands with Shashmaag for the same. (2023, 2024, 2025)
- Behzaad Khan as Uttan: Shaashvaan Lok's ruler; Baalveer's mentor. He is a stickler who always aims to uphold Shaashvaan Lok's rules. (2023, 2024,2025)

=== Recurring ===
- Shridhar Watsar as
  - Dooba Dooba 1: Tauba Tauba's twin brother; Baalveer's best friend; The General of all the other dwarfs recruited for the security of the fairies in Pari Lok. (2012–2016, 2019–2021)
  - Tauba Tauba: Dooba Dooba 1's twin brother; Aageel's maternal uncle; A sidekick of all the evil fairies and Bhaymar. (2012–2016, 2019–2021, 2023, 2024, 2025)
  - Mauka Mauka, sidekick of Kaal and lookalike of Dooba Dooba and Tauba Tauba. (2021)
  - Watsar also portrayed various characters including Chocolate Uncle (2013-2014), Bagi Chacha (2012–2016), Chittu (2015-2016)
- Purvesh Pimple as Montu Lakhani: A naughty boy who always bothers Manav, Meher, and other children at school; Chintu and Chinti's cousin; later, Debu's arch enemy (2012–2016, 2020-2021)
- Aditi Sajwan as Natkhat Pari: one of the Saptapari; a unique fairy with the power to make anything and change her size. She is very close to Rani Pari. She guides Baalveer throughout his journey to fight evil. She is killed by Bhayankar Pari in 2014 but is resurrected by Rani Pari in 2016. (2012–2014)
  - Neeru Singh replaced Sajwan as Natkhat Pari. (2016)
- Lavina Tandon as Gaal Pari: One of the Saptapari; a fairy in Pari Lok who has the power to blow giant balloons with unique qualities. (2012–14)
  - Neha Narang replaced Tandon as Gaal Pari. (2014)
  - Suman Gupta replaced Narang as Gaal Pari. (2015–2016)
- Samikssha Batnagar as Vijdhar Pari: One of the Saptapari; A fairy in Pari Lok who has the power of electricity. (2012–2013)
  - Minal Mogam replaced Batnagar as Vijdhar Pari. (2013–2016)
- Manisha Thakkar as Bhatkati Pari: One of the Saptapari; a fairy in Pari Lok who has the power of diverting things and making confusing illusions. (2012–2016)
- Sangeeta Khanayat as Aarpaar Pari: One of the Saptapari; a fairy in Pari Lok who has the power to pass through objects. (2012)
  - Dimple Kava
    - replaced Khanayat as Aarpaar Pari. (2013–16)
    - as Dimple Pandey: Jolly's wife and Happy's sister-in-law (2021)
- Charu Asopa as Atkaati Pari: One of the Saptapari; a fairy in Pari Lok who has the power to create obstacles in the way of anything. (2012–2015)
  - Richa Mehta Swami replaced Asopa as Atkaati Pari. (2016)
- Rashmi Singh as Taraz Pari: Naraz Pari's friend; A fairy in Pari Lok who possesses the ability to break things. She initially helps Bhayankar Pari secretly along with Naraz Pari, but later reconciles with the fairies. (2012–2013)
- Roop Durgapal as Dari Pari: A fairy in Pari Lok who is always afraid but also has the power to frighten others. (2012)
  - Sameeksha Sud replaced Durgapal as Dari Pari. (2013–16)
- Pallavi Dutt as Naraz Pari: Taraz Pari's friend; A fairy in Pari Lok with the power to make people angry; She is initially jealous of the other fairies and helps Bhayankar Pari, but later regrets her mistake and chooses the path of righteousness. (2012–2015)
- Danica Moadi as Bhari Pari: A fairy in Pari Lok, who possesses the power to make someone cry. (2012)
  - Sandhya Kashyap replaced Moadi as Bhari Pari (2015-2016)
- Shahina Surve as Firang Pari: A fairy in Pari Lok, who appears and speaks like an Anglo-Indian. She possesses the power of language. (2012–2013)
- Nilu Roy as Navrang Pari: A fairy in Pari Lok, who possesses the power to change the color of an object into nine different colors. (2012)
- Ekroop Bedi as Vigyan Pari: A fairy who is a scientist and inventor in Pari Lok. She possesses the power of science. (2015)
  - Prajakta Gaikwad replaced Bedi as Vigyan Pari. (2016)
- Shweta Tiwari as Mahabhasm Pari: An evil fairy with the power to turn anything into ashes. She used to be Manbadal Pari, who could change anybody's mindset. Later, she kills herself to summon Mahavinashini. (2014-2015)
- Aashka Goradia as Mahavinashini: An evil fairy created by the five elements of nature - Air, Water, Earth, Fire, and Sky - along with five evil fairies who kill themselves to summon her. She is also defeated and killed by Baalveer. (2015–2016)
- Nigaar Khan as Prachandika: An evil fairy who comes to take revenge on Baalveer for her sister Virus' death, but is eventually defeated and killed. (2016)
- Gazala Selmin as Shaatir Pari: An accomplice fairy of Mahavinashini and Prachandika, who advises them on strategies to defeat Baalveer and the fairies. (2015–2016)
- Reshmi Ghosh as Daityani: An evil fairy who sleeps for ages due to the magic of the fairies, but eventually rises to take revenge on them. Mahavinashini kills her. (2015)
- Arishfa Khan as
  - Minty: Montu's Cousin (2013)
  - Dant Pari (2014)
  - Monica Gehi: A student at Manav and Meher's school. She is the most beautiful girl in the school, and all the boys love her. She develops a crush on Baalveer after he saves her from drowning. (2016)
- Amita Choksi as Smita Dagli: Mahesh's wife; Manav and Meher's mother. (2012–2016)
- Abhay Harpade as Mahesh Dagli: Amrutlal and Kasturi's elder son; Rocky's brother; Smita's husband; Manav and Meher's father. (2012–2016)
- Ashish Bhatt as Amrutlal Dagli: Kasturi's husband; Mahesh and Rocky's father; Manav and Meher's grandfather (2012–2016)
- Alpana Buch as Kasturi Dagli: Amrutlal's wife; Mahesh and Rocky's mother; Manav and Meher's grandmother (2012-2016)
- Raashul Tandon as Rocky Dagli: Amrutlal and Kasturi's younger son; Mahesh's brother; Manav and Meher's uncle, who loves playing like a child. (2012–2016)
- Hrihtik Mishra as Rohit: A friend and accomplice of Montu, helping him to bother children at school. (2012–2016)
- Keval Vora as Keval: A friend and accomplice of Montu, helping him to bother children at school. (2012–2015)
- Shruti Bisht as Saloni: Manav and Meher's friend. (2014–2016)
- Viren Vazirani as Pukky: Manav and Meher's friend (2013–2015).
- Meghna Nikade as Chakravyuh Pari: A fairy who has the power to create mazes and labyrinths. She helps Bhayankar Pari in her attempts to defeat Baalveer. Later, she kills herself to summon Mahavinasni. (2015)
- Navina Bole as Nukeeli/Kateeli Pari: The fairy twins with the powers of pricking like a needle and cutting like scissors, respectively. They help Bhayankar Pari in her efforts to defeat Baalveer. Later, Nukeeli kills herself to summon Mahavinasni. (2015)
- Tiya Gandwani as
  - Patanga Pari: An evil fairy with the power to fly like a kite. (2015)
  - Devaki: Shwet Lok's former queen; Aditya Pratap's widow; Ananya and Vivaan's mother. She was captured and imprisoned by Timnasa, but later rescued by Baalveer.(2020)
- Swati Verma as Kakli Daayan: A witch who wants to become young by killing children. (2015)
- Priyanka Sharma as Sarangi Pari: An evil fairy who possesses the power to make colors with different qualities. (2015)
- Namit Shah as Jaiveer. (2014)
- Sugandha Mishra as Chhal Pari: Bhayankar Pari's best friend; An evil fairy who has the power to trick anyone and to sing beautifully. She helps Bhayankar Pari to defeat Baalveer, but ends up killing Rani Pari.(2013–2014)
- Deepshikha Nagpal as Bawandar Pari: An evil fairy who has the power to create typhoons and whirlwinds. She also helps Bhayankar Pari to defeat Baalveer. Later, she kills herself to summon Mahavinasni. (2013–2015)
- Akshay Sethi as Mogambo Gomango. (2014)
- Kunal Bakshi as
  - Hubahu (2015)
  - Imaya: an evil Egyptian king (2021)
- Rajesh Khera as Gurudev. (2016)
- Vaishali Thakkar as Honey Bhua: Amrutlal's sister; Mahesh and Rocky's aunt(2015)
- Monaz Mevawala as Bhraman Pari: An evil fairy who returns to take revenge on Baal Pari for defeating her. Later, she is killed by the fairies. (2014)
- Arsheen Namdar as
  - Chahya Pari: An evil fairy who possesses the qualities of a shadow. She helps Mahabhasm Pari to defeat Baalveer (2014)
  - child Timnasa (2019–2020)
- Dilip Shah as Goba-Goba. (2013–2014)
- Geetanjali as Jwala. (2014)
- Kamya Pandey as Sapna Pari: A fairy in Pari Lok who is in charge of protecting others' dreams. (2015)
- Piya Valecha as Suraksha Pari: A fairy who is in charge of guarding the Prison.
- Rashami Patil as Rakshak Pari: The secret messenger of Rani Pari. As well as Rani Pari, she knows the secret of Baalveer's past life. (2015)
- Kavalya Chheda as Ronnie: A bully who always bothers Manav, Meher, and other children in school like Montu. (2014)
- Anita Date as Tabahee: An evil fairy defeated by Baalveer (2013)
- Javed Pathan as eroah Yoddhah
- Dhruv Bhavsar as
  - Rajnikant (2012)
  - Sachin: Saloni's brother; Manav and Meher's friend (2014)
- Atul Verma as
  - Jabdali: a loyal companion of Timanasa. He is killed by Vivaan. (2019–2020)
  - Andher: Aageel's soldier. (2023, 2024, 2025)
- Shailendra Pandey
  - as Shaurya (Voice): a white lion who is the guardian of Veer Lok and the mentor of Baalveer and Vivaan. (2019–2021)
  - as Akroor (Voice): a black panther who is the protector of Kaal Lok. He is defeated by Shaurya in Antim Yuddh but returns along with Timnasa. (2019–2020, 2021)
- Krutika Desai as Masti Pari: a fairy in Pari Lok with the power to increase or decrease her size; Megha on Earth as one of Dev's sisters. Most of the time, she accompanies and guides Vivaan just like Natkhat Pari guided Baalveer. She gets killed by Bhaymar while saving Ananya. (2019–2020)
- Bhaweeka Chaudhary as Paani Pari: A fairy in Pari Lok with the power of water; Payal on Earth as one of Dev's sisters. She helps Baalveer and Vivaan in their adventures with the powers of water. (2019–2021)
- Anuradha Khaira as Dhwani Pari: a fairy in Pari Lok with the power of sound; Diksha on Earth as one of Dev's sisters. (2019–2021)
- Khushi Mukherjee as Jwala Pari: a fairy in Pari Lok with the power of fire; Jiya on Earth as one of Dev's sisters. She is characterized by her anger and strictness. She is killed by Timnasa, but later resurrected by Baal Pari. (2019–2020)
  - Urvi Gor replaced Mukherjee as Jwala Pari. (2020–2021)
- Amika Shail as Vayu Pari: a fairy in Pari Lok with the power of wind; Vidhi on Earth as one of Dev's sisters. She is killed by Timnasa, but later resurrected by Baal Pari. (2019–2020)
  - Nandini Tiwari replaced Shail as Vayu Pari. (2020–2021)
- Vimarsh Roshan as Bambaal: Shinkai's commander and cunning traitor; Kaikos's younger brother; he plots to take over his brother's throne and rule over the universe, but is killed by Baalveer. (2020)
- Shweta Khanduri as Milsa: Bambaal's accomplice who is killed by him to hide their secret. (2020)
- Ayesha Khan as Birba: the new loyalist of Bambaal. She is the most successful scientist in Shinkai after Milsa. (2020)
- Jaya Binju Tyagi as Karuna: Vivaan's adoptive and Khushi's biological mother; Dadasaheb's daughter-in-law; a businesswoman living in Bharat Nagar who runs a tiffin service. She is a kind and generous person who oftens donates food to the poor.(2019–2021)
- Khushi Bhardwaj
  - as Khushi: Vivaan's adoptive sister, Karuna's daughter; an obedient girl who always listens to her elders and loves her family. (2019–2021)
  - as Kiki(Voice): a young female elephant calf who is Dooba-Dooba's best friend. (2019–2021)
- Arista Mehta as Sutli Girpade: Vivaan, and Gopu's best friend; Padmini's daughter; an intelligent girl who belongs to a middle-class family and lives with her mother and maternal uncle in Bharat Nagar. (2019–2020)
  - Sia Bhatia replaced Mehta as Sutli Girpade (2020–2021)
- Hridyansh Shekhawat as Gopu Chheda: Vivaan and Sutli's best friend. The trio plan to thwart the troubles created by Chintu and Chinti. His father is the owner of a general store in Bharat Nagar. (2019–2020)
- Yachit Sharma as Rinkoo: Vivaan and Sutli's friend. (2020–2021)
- Aarna Bhadoriya as Chinti Mishra: Chintu's sister, who keeps on troubling Vivaan and his friends along with her brother. (2019–2021)
- Abhay Bhadoriya as Chintu Mishra: Chinti's brother, who keeps on troubling Vivaan and his friends along with his sister. (2019–2021)
- Priya Sharma as Nagini: She is a Gorgon and is brought to life by Bhaymar in Baghdad. She is defeated by Baalveer and Aladdin. She returns to take revenge, but dies due to her own poison. (2020)
- Samay Thakkar as Sarvakaal (voice): the monstrous sage of Shwet Lok, who sheltered Timnasa after her banishment, but was later betrayed and captured by her. Later, he helps Baalveer and Vivaan to kill Timnasa by giving his powers. (2020)
- Tapan A. Bhatt as Dadasaheb: Khushi's grandfather; Vivaan's adoptive grandfather; Karuna's father-in-law. He is a very talkative person. (2019–2021)
- Guru Saran Tiwari as Munna Mishra: Kamini's husband; Chintu and Chinti's father; a selfish and greedy man who always shows off his richness. (2019–2021)
- Anuradha Verma as Kamini Mishra: Munna's wife; Chintu and Chinti's mother; She also shows off her richness. (2019–2021)
- Akshay Bhagat as Ratilal Chheda: Gopu's father; Diwali's husband; a miser who runs a general store in Bharat Nagar. (2019–2021)
- Neha Prajapati as Diwali Chheda: Gopu's mother; Ratilal's wife. She is a very caring mother towards her son. (2019–2021)
- Ajay Padhye as Inspector Shantaram Girpade: Sutli's maternal uncle; Padmini's younger brother; a bachelor who admires Megha(Masti Pari's human form) and always tries to impress her. (2019–2021)
- Shruti Gholap as Padmini Girpade: Sutli's mother; Shantaram's elder sister; a middle-class woman who struggles with her and her daughter's financial needs. (2019–2021)
- Reena as Dr. Shalini: Rinkoo's mother; a Gynaecologist. She operated Karuna during the birth of her stillborn second child and knows about Vivaan's adoption. (2020–2021)
- Heer Chopra as Saral Pari: a fairy in Pari Lok with the power of simplifying complex tasks. She is killed by Akroor for threatening Netra Pari. (2019)
- Alisha Chaudhary as Netra Pari: a fairy of Pari Lok with the power of vision. Her body is used by Timnasa against Baalveer for finding his successor. She is later killed by Timnasa. (2019)
- Shailesh Gulabani as
  - Parikshak, a sidekick of Bambaal sent to earth for capturing Baalveer. (2020)
  - Babel Sahay : Tuyeer's lover-turned husband; Kaashvi’s father. He is killed by Shashmaag. (2023)
- Shagun Singh as Jiya: Chintu and Chinti's cousin; Vivaan's dance competition rival who later becomes his friend. (2020)
- Amit Lohia as Mahabali: Guru Gyani's disciple who wears a protective dress and crown which cannot be destroyed by Veer Lok's protective shield. He is defeated by Baalveer and Vivaan and reconciles with Guru Gyani who sends him to the Himalayas. (2021)
- Shresth Saxena as Akal: Mand's twin brother; a hunter of goodness who converts good entities into trophies with his magical arrows. (2021)
- Shubh Saxena as Man: Akal's twin brother; a hunter of goodness who converts good entities into trophies with his magical arrows. (2021)
- Sharik Khan as
  - Vivaan and Sutli's friend (2020–2021)
  - Pichku (voice): a baby ghost who was trapped in Veer Lok by Shaurya and fairies and has the ability to turn into any object or go through it. He can cure any disease or wound. (2021)
- Bharat Bhatia as Babban: Boss of Babban Seth and Sons who want to build Casino in the playground. (2021)
- Myra Singh as Aarohi: a courageous girl from Benaras who becomes Vivaan, Sutli and Rinkoo's friend. (2021)
- Shweta Gautam as Radha Pandey: Happy and Jolly's mother; Kuki and Puki's grandmother (2021)
- Mihir Rajda as Jolly Pandey: Radha's son; Happy's brother; Dimple's husband; Kuki and Puki's father (2021)
- Ayat Shaikh as Kuki Pandey: Dimple and Jolly's daughter; Puki's sister (2021)
- Krish Rao as Puki Pandey: Dimple and Jolly's son; Kuki's brother (2021)
- Rajat Dahiya as Bhasm: Baalveer's biological-father; Benaam's husband. He was initially a soldier of Shaashvaan-Lok who defied Uttan for his sinister intentions of conquering the world. (2023, 2024)
  - Manish Khanna as
    - Kancha Cheena. (2014)
    - Badrinath Sharma: Bhasm's human form. He is devoid of his memories and powers and is kept by Baalveer on Earth to prevent Bhasma from causing further destruction. (2024)
- Anupama Kuwar as Tetra: Aageel's soldier. (2023)
- Kunal Seth as Bardol: A secret agent of Shaashvaan Lok. He informs Shaashvaan Lok whenever evil powers attack Earth. He is turned into a stone by Aageel, but is later rescued by Baalveer. (2023, 2024, 2025)
- Aman Bhutada as Dillaak : Baalveer's friend in Udaka Lok. (2023, 2024, 2025)
- Megha Agarwal as Vahamir: Baalveer’s friend in Udaka Lok. (2023, 2024, 2025)
- Neelesh Malviya as Hobaad: Shashmaag’s wise assistant in Shaashvaan Lok, who secretly advises Shashmaag in his treacherous plans. (2023, 2024, 2025)
- Vinayak Bhave as Bhaskar Bhardwaj: Gargi's husband; Navya's father; Eva’s uncle; a magician who is entrusted with the task of taking care of Baalveer while he is on Earth. (2023)
- Geeta Bisht as Gargi Bhardwaj: Bhaskar's wife, Navya’s mother; Eva’s aunt (2023, 2024, 2025)
- Ruchi Singh as Eva Bhardwaj: Bhaskar's niece (2023, 2024, 2025)
- Shahab Khan as Mr. Bhardwaj: Bhaskar’s father; Eva and Navya's grandfather; He shares a congenial bond with Veer and often accompanies him in his pranks. (2023, 2024)
- Hiya Bhatt as Navya Bhardwaj: Bhaskar and Gargi's daughter; She was mute due to a psychological disorder that arose post a dreadful accident but regaibs her voice through Veer’s powers. (2023, 2024, 2025)
- Shweta Rastogi as Adishi: Baalveer's adoptive mother; She guides the people of Udaka Lok and holds a revered place in Shaashvaan Lok. She is killed by Shashmaag after she reveals his true intentions. (2023)
  - Aditi Tambe as young Adishi (2024)
- Mahima Gupta as Kinkori : Baalveer's friend in Udaka Lok. (2023)
- Patrali Chattopadhyay as Tuyeer / Trishna Sahay: Babel's lover-turned-wife; Kaashvi’s mother; the commander of Aageel's forces and her trusted ally who is later killed by her. (2023)
- Jinal Jain as Renu: Kaashvi’s friend (2023)
- Venkatesh Pande as Param (2024, 2025)
- Ahmad Harhash as Happy Singh: Kaashvi's friend (2023–2024)

=== Guest ===
- Rukhsar Rehman as Maa Pari: The creator and former ruler of Pari Lok. She passes her throne to Bahuroopi Pari. (2012)
- Bharti Singh as Bharti Mausi (2014)
- Kurt Angle as Kurt Angle (2014)
- Digvijay Purohit as Jalraj Kaikos: the ruler of Shinkai; Bambaal's elder brother (2020)
- Siddharth Nigam as Aladdin from Aladdin – Naam Toh Suna Hoga. (2020)
- Raashul Tandon as Ginu from Aladdin – Naam Toh Suna Hoga. (2020)
- Aamir Dalvi as Zafar from Aladdin – Naam Toh Suna Hoga. (2020)
- Ketan Karande as Tejas Pehelwan: a strong wrestler who is defeated by Happy in a wrestling competition. (2021)
- Garima Goel as Kiara: an event head who gives Veer an opportunity to conduct a magic show in a large event. (2023)

== Crossover ==
Baalveer Returns had a crossover with Aladdin – Naam Toh Suna Hoga from 27 January 2020 to 31 January 2020.

== Production ==
=== Season 2 ===
==== Development ====
The commencement of the show, a sequel to the children's fantasy series Baalveer, was announced in early August 2019 by Optimystix Entertainment and Sony SAB. The first promo was released in August 2019. The new series cast Dev Joshi as Senior Baalveer, and introduced Vansh Sayani in a lead role as Baalveer's successor. Pavitra Punia was cast as the evil fairy, Timnasa.

==== Filming ====
The series is being taped on sets at Film City, in Mumbai, Maharashtra, India After the Indian government announced the COVID-19 lockdown, the show ceased airing new episodes, along with other shows throughout the Indian entertainment industry. Four months later, after the government relaxed restrictions, the series resumed airing of new episodes, continuing with the storyline that had been interrupted.

==== Casting ====
In 2020, Pavitra Punia announced that she would exit the series to participate in Season 14 of Bigg Boss. Subsequently, Krutika Desai, Amika Shail and Khushi Mukherjee also quit the show.

The storyline ended and producers announced a new arc, introducing the underwater kingdom of Shinkai, which would be populated by new villains, Bambaal, Milsa and Ray, played by Vimarsh Roshan, Shweta Khanduri and Shoaib Ali, respectively. In mid-December 2020, makers announced that Vimarsh Roshan was leaving the series and Aditya Ranvijay would return as Bhaymaar. In early January 2021, makers announced the return of Pavitra Punia as Timnasa also, following her eviction from Bigg Boss.

Later Dev Joshi played six different characters.

=== Season 3 ===
In December 2022, the series was announced by Optimystix Entertainment for Sony SAB and Sony LIV through an announcement teaser. The shooting of this series began in January 2023. Principal photography commenced in Mumbai. Dev Joshi was cast in the titular role and was joined by Aditi Sanwal as leads. Simultaneously, Ada Khan was cast for negative role.

=== Season 4 ===
Baalveer Season 4 was released on 6 May 2024. Rajat Dahiya cast to play negative role.

=== Season 5 ===
Baalveer Season 5 was released on 7 April 2025.Venkatesh pandey cast to play negative role

== Reception ==
The first episode of Baalveer Returns has over 45 million views on YouTube. Baalveer Returns episode 233 has over 72 million views on YouTube. Its 170 episode has over 60 million views.
