= Tim Dodd =

American space science communicator (born 1985)

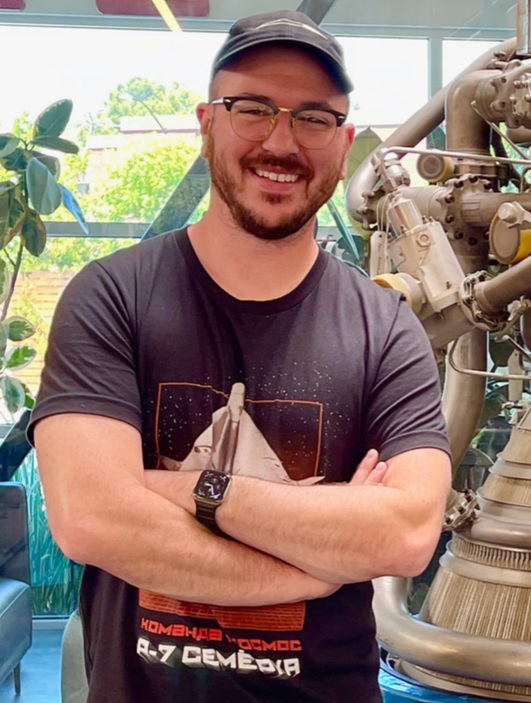
- Dodd with the RL10 rocket engine in 2021
- Born: February 27, 1985 (age 41); Iowa, U.S.
- Occupation: Science communicator
- Years active: 2014-present

YouTube information
- Channel: Everyday Astronaut
- Years active: 2016–present
- Subscribers: 1.9 million
- Views: 356 million
- Last updated: 9 January 2026
- Website: everydayastronaut.com

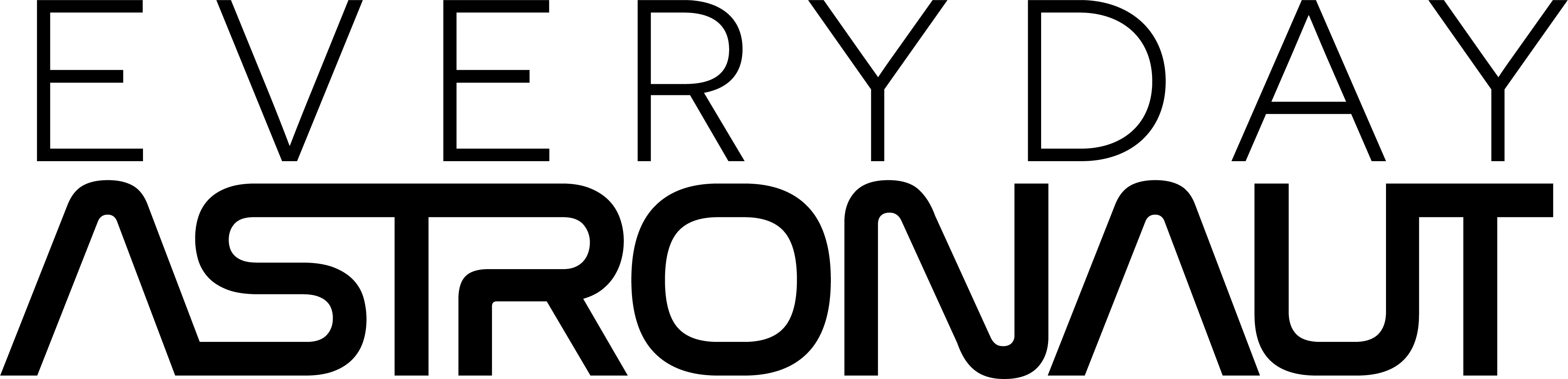
The logo of "Everyday Astronaut"

Timothy Justin Dodd (born February 27, 1985), also known as the Everyday Astronaut, is an American science communicator, YouTube content creator, photographer, and musician. After becoming popular with his space-themed photo series, Dodd was hired by the website Spaceflight Now to photograph SpaceX's CRS-3 cargo mission to the International Space Station on April 18, 2014, NASA's Orion Test Flight EFT-1 on December 5, 2014, the United States Air Force's GPS 2F-9 launch, and NASA's OA-6 Mission on March 23, 2016.

== Career ==
Dodd originally worked as a photographer, where his main source of income was in wedding photography. His photography schedule allowed much free time, and he began using this free time to become involved in rocket photography.

In 2013, he purchased an orange Russian high altitude survivor suit (crucial for water landings) in an online auction and later took photos of himself in the suit at a 2014 rocket launch in Cape Canaveral, Florida, as a joke; for a time, the suit was a trademark of his YouTube channel. In late 2016, he grew dissatisfied with photography as his main means of employment, and continued to pursue his "Everyday Astronaut" internet persona on Instagram and Twitter. In 2017, he created a YouTube channel covering spaceflight education, and that became his primary occupation. He also makes music, which has been used as background music for Rocket Lab launches.

After applying for the mission in 2022, Dodd was selected to participate in a lunar spaceflight as part of the dearMoon project crew. The mission was to take place aboard the SpaceX Starship. Had it proceeded, dearMoon would have been the first commercial cislunar spaceflight, and it would have made Dodd the first YouTuber to enter cislunar space. The project was cancelled in June 2024, with the organizers citing broader Starship program delays for the cancellation.

From 2023, he transformed his annual spaceflight recap videos of that the preceding year in spaceflight, dubbed "Astro Awards" to an in-person awards show. The Astro Awards have been held every year since then, honoring inspirational, innovative, and important mission of the preceding year, similar to the Michael Collins Trophy, presented by National Air and Space Museum.

On 17 March 2025, the International Astronomical Union named the Mars-crossing asteroid 1999 RC_{2} as 27234 Timdodd, in honor of his career.

== Astro Awards ==
Dodd started an annual virtual award ceremony in 2017 to share the highlights of every year in spaceflight and commemorate the revolutionary space agencies and their missions. But since 2024, Dodd started the in-person version of the Astro Awards and called up spokespersons from different agencies and rewarded them and their team for dawning space missions in that year. The Astro Awards ceremonies are held annually in January at the Paramount Theatre in Austin, Texas.

== Astro Awards winners ==
=== 2017 winners ===
Honorable mention – SpaceX Falcon Heavy

Seventh place – SpaceX CRS-10 for refurbishment and use of the LC39A launchpad leased from NASA three years prior

Sixth place – ISRO PSLV C-37 for India's achievement of launching 103 satellites into polar orbit at a low cost of $15 million

Fifth place – The discovery of Oumuamua, the first known interstellar object to pass through the Solar System

Fourth place – Observation of both light waves, X-rays, and gravitational waves via the LIGO observation of a Kilonova

Third place – Total Solar eclipse over much of the continental United States in August of 2017

Second place – Final observations of Cassini while intentionally crashing into Saturn's atmosphere to avoid contamination of Saturn's moons

First place – SpaceX SES-10 for the first reflight of an orbital-class booster, core 21

2018 winners

Honorable mention – Jet Propulsion Laboratory for Voyager II's entrance into interstellar space

Honorable mention – Soyuz MS-10 abortion for the safe recovery of all the astronauts aboard the mission

Honorable mention – Virgin Galactic's VSS Unity for the start of its operation of suborbital space tourism

Honorable mention – OSIRIS-REx for its successful collision and return of a sample from the Bennu asteroid

Honorable mention – TESS satellite for its finding of many new exoplanets

Honorable mention – Hayabusa 2, for Japan's mission to Ryugu

Honorable mention – NASA CCDev program selection of SpaceX and Boeing to restore American astronaut access to the International Space Station, bypassing increasingly expensive Soyuz missions

Honorable mention – ISRO's Gangayan preparations for human spaceflight at a very low cost

Honorable mention – Rocket Lab's It's Business Time mission, for being the first launch of its Electron rocket to reach orbit and deliver a payload

Honorable mention – NASA JPL's Parker Solar Probe for its mission to study the outer corona of the Sun

Honorable mention – SpaceX Falcon 9 Block 5 deployment and flight

Honorable mention – NASA InSight mission for successfully landing on and observing Mars

Honorable mention – SpaceX Falcon Heavy's first flight

== See also ==
- Scott Manley, another YouTuber who makes videos about spaceflight
