= Being Different (film) =

1981 Canadian documentary film

- Directed by: Harry Rasky
- Written by: Harry Rasky
- Produced by: Harold Greenberg; Robert Kline; Harry Rasky
- Narrated by: Christopher Plummer
- Cinematography: Hideaki Kobayashi
- Edited by: Mavis Lyons Smull
- Music by: Paul Zaza
- Production companies: Astral Bellevue Pathé; The Movie Store; Trans-Atlantic Enterprises
- Distributed by: Astral Films
- Release date: June 1981
- Running time: 100 minutes
- Country: Canada
- Language: English

Being Different is a Canadian documentary film, directed by Harry Rasky and released in 1981. Adapted in part from Leslie Fiedler's 1978 book Freaks: Myths and Images of the Secret Self, the film profiles various people, including amputees, people with dwarfism, conjoined twins and people who are much taller or fatter than average, who have physical characteristics that make them different from the "norm", and centres on both the positive and negative aspects of their experiences.

Figures appearing in the film included actor Billy Barty; Jóhann K. Pétursson, a 7'8" circus entertainer; Sandy Allen, who was recognized by the Guinness Book of Records as the tallest living woman in the world; Percilla Bejano, a woman with hypertrichosis who performed in sideshows as “The Monkey Girl”; and Peter Strudwick, a German-American marathon runner who was born without feet.

The film premiered at the 1981 Montreal World Film Festival, and was screened at the 1981 Festival of Festivals in September. Allen personally attended a later commercial screening at Toronto's Carlton Theatre in October.

== Response ==
Jay Scott of The Globe and Mail called it "Rasky's finest film, and that assessment includes Homage to Chagall, for which he received an Oscar nomination."

Maureen Peterson of the Montreal Gazette praised it as "a documentary about the handicapped that has warmth and humour and is almost miraculously devoid of voyeurism and sensationalism", concluding that "if a work of art is something which nourishes our spirit and alters our perception, then Being Different is a work of art." Michael Walsh of The Province, conversely, contrasted it unfavourably against Tod Browning's infamously controversial 1932 film Freaks, writing that "I couldn't shake the feeling that Being Different is too self-consciously well-intentioned, a film rather desperate to mask its less-than-wholesome voyeuristic tendencies with goodwill. All things considered, Browning, the old ex-carney, made a more honest film."

The film received a Genie Award nomination for Best Feature Length Documentary at the 3rd Genie Awards in 1982.
