= Martin Laurello =

Sideshow performer and biological rarity

Martin Joe Laurello
- Born: Martin Emmerling c. 1886; Germany
- Died: 1955 (aged 68–69)
- Occupation: Sideshow performer
- Known for: Could turn his head 180 degrees

Martin Joe Laurello (born Martin Emmerling, 1885–1955), also known by the stage names Human Owl and Bobby the Boy with the Revolving Head, was a German-American sideshow performer and biological rarity who could turn his head 180 degrees to the rear. He performed with groups such as Ripley's Believe it or Not, Ringling Brothers, and Barnum & Bailey.

== Early life ==
Laurello was born Martin Emmerling in Germany circa 1886. In 1921, together with a handful of other people with biological rarities from Europe, Laurello arrived in the United States. Laurello could turn his head 120 degrees. In the words of fellow sideshow performer Percilla Bejano, known as the "Monkey Girl", "[Laurello] could put his head all the way around". To accomplish this feat, he reportedly practised rotating his head for three years and also had to "dislocate various vertebrae". Being born with a slightly bent spine might have also aided Laurello in pulling off his act of flexibility.

== Career ==
After discovering his unusual ability, Laurello spent several years developing it into a professional act. According to later accounts, he practised for hours each day and reportedly used a custom-made apparatus of iron bars and leather straps to gradually increase the range of motion in his neck until he could rotate his head approximately 180 degrees. He toured Europe before emigrating to the United States in 1921 aboard the White Star liner Olympic, travelling with a group of other European sideshow performers exhibited as giants and other biological rarities.

Upon arriving in the United States, Laurello began performing with Ringling Bros. and Barnum & Bailey Circus, where audiences were drawn by his ability to stand with his back to the crowd while looking directly at them over his shoulder.

By 1924, Laurello had joined a travelling show managed by T. A. Wolfe. During the 1920s and 1930s, he also appeared at Coney Island, Hubert's Museum in New York City, and the Ripley's Believe It or Not! Odditoriums, where he became one of the company's best-known attractions. In 1926, he demonstrated his unusual ability before hundreds of physicians attending an osteopathic convention in Philadelphia, who examined the movement of his neck and concluded that it was genuine, although highly unusual.

In addition to his signature performance, Laurello trained dogs and cats to perform acrobatic tricks, sometimes presenting the animal act alongside his own exhibitions. He continued performing into the 1940s, including appearances at the 1939 New York World's Fair, and by the middle of that decade had worked more than 200 weeks for Ripley's Believe It or Not! alone.

== Marketing and public image ==
From the early 1920s until the end of his career, Laurello was promoted as a medical curiosity whose extraordinary flexibility appeared to defy explanation. His performances emphasized the appearance that his head had been turned completely around. He often stood with his back to the audience while maintaining eye contact over his shoulder, sometimes pretending to smoke a cigarette or drink a beer to heighten the effect. During his career, he appeared under several stage names, including The Human Owl, The Human Periscope, The Man with the Revolving Head, and Bobby the Boy with the Revolving Head.

Advertisements frequently offered a US$1,000 reward to anyone who could duplicate Laurello's feat, while newspaper coverage highlighted examinations by physicians who concluded that his unusual range of motion was genuine. During the 1930s and 1940s, his appearances with Ripley's Believe It or Not! helped establish him as one of the company's best-known attractions.

Like many sideshow performers in the early twentieth century, Laurello was frequently described in newspapers as a "freak", reflecting the language commonly used at the time to advertise people exhibited in sideshows. In 1922, he joined other members of the American Sideshow Performers' Association in publicly protesting the label. The performers argued that they preferred to be known as "strange people" rather than "freaks", contending that the term was inaccurate and demeaning despite its widespread use in newspaper publicity.

== Arrest ==
On 30 April 1931, Laurello was arrested by Baltimore police during a tent-packed performance for abandoning his spouse and two sons, after she lodged a complaint via telegram. He was reportedly found standing on a platform with his back and face looking towards the crowd, and when the two officers confronted him, he turned his head around and winked at them both, then was placed under arrest.
