= 38th Directors Guild of America Awards =

- Date: March 8, 1986
- Location: The Beverly Hilton, Los Angeles, California; Plaza Hotel, New York City
- Country: United States
- Presented by: Directors Guild of America

Highlights
- Best Director Feature Film: The Color Purple – Steven Spielberg
- Website: https://www.dga.org/Awards/History/1980s/1985.aspx?value=1985

The 38th Directors Guild of America Awards, honoring the outstanding directorial achievements in film and television in 1985, were presented on March 8, 1986, at the Beverly Hilton and the Plaza Hotel. The nominees in seven television categories were announced on January 23, 1986 and the feature film nominees were announced on January 29, 1986.

== Winners and nominees ==
=== Film ===
Feature Film

Steven Spielberg – The Color Purple

- Ron Howard – Cocoon
- John Huston – Prizzi's Honor
- Sydney Pollack – Out of Africa
- Peter Weir – Witness

=== Television ===
Drama Series

Will Mackenzie – Moonlighting for "My Fair David"

- Ray Danton – Cagney & Lacey for "Who Said it's Fair? (Part 2)"
- Paul Michael Glaser – Miami Vice for "Smuggler's Blues"
Comedy Series

Jay Sandrich – The Golden Girls for "Pilot"

- James Burrows – Cheers for "Birth, Death, Love and Rice"
- Peter Werner – Moonlighting for "The Dream Sequence Always Rings Twice"
Miniseries or TV Film

John Erman – An Early Frost

- Jeff Bleckner – Do You Remember Love
- Lamont Johnson – Wallenberg: A Hero's Story
Musical Variety

Don Mischer – Motown Returns to the Apollo

- Marty Pasetta – The 57th Annual Academy Awards
- Tony Verna, Sandi Fullerton, Louis J. Horvitz, and Wendy Acey – Live Aid
Daytime Drama

Sandy Tung – CBS Schoolbreak Special for "The Day the Senior Class Got Married"

- Claude Kerven – ABC Afterschool Special for "High School Narc"
- Michael Uno – CBS Schoolbreak Special for "The War Between the Classes"
Documentary/Actuality

Harry Rasky – Homage to Chagall: The Colours of Love

- John Cosgrove – Missing... Have You Seen This Person?
- Jody Eldred – The China Experience: Beyond the Wall
Sports

Andy Kindle and David Michaels – 1985 Tour de France

- David Caldwell – 1985 U.S. Figure Skating Championships
- Edward Nathanson, Harold R. Cline, and Bob Levy – 1985 Wimbledon Championships – Men's Singles

=== Commercials ===
Commercials

Ed Bianchi – Diet Pepsi's "Forward Pass", National Institute on Drug Abuse's "Gauntlet", Bounce's "Jump", and American Express' "Young Lawyers"

- Leslie Dektor – Apple's "American Dream" and "Changes", Levi's' "Bluesmen" and "The Gathering", and Coca-Cola's "Havens"
- Jim Johnston – United Negro College Fund's "Father and Son", California Cooler's "Matt", and Nike's "The Shooter"
- Richard Levine – Pacific Bell's "Boxers" and the Church of Jesus Christ of Latter-day Saints' "The More I See You"
- Joe Pytka – Pepsi's "Archeology", Special Olympics' "E.T. Special Olympics", and Henry Weinhard's' "Saloon"

=== D.W. Griffith Award ===
- Joseph L. Mankiewicz

=== Robert B. Aldrich Service Award ===
- George Sidney
