= Carny (1980 film) =

1980 film by Robert Kaylor

- Directed by: Robert Kaylor
- Written by: Phoebe Kaylor (story); Robert Kaylor (story); Robbie Robertson (story); Thomas Baum
- Produced by: Robbie Robertson
- Starring: Gary Busey; Jodie Foster; Robbie Robertson; Meg Foster; Kenneth McMillan; Elisha Cook Jr.; Tim Thomerson; Theodore Wilson
- Cinematography: Harry Stradling Jr.
- Edited by: Stuart H. Pappé
- Music by: Alex North; Robbie Robertson
- Production company: Lorimar Film Entertainment
- Distributed by: United Artists
- Release date: June 13, 1980
- Running time: 107 minutes
- Country: United States
- Language: English
- Budget: $6 million
- Box office: $1.8 million

Carny is a 1980 American drama film about a waitress who joins a traveling carnival. It stars Gary Busey, Jodie Foster, and Robbie Robertson. It also includes an early role for Fred Ward.

== Plot ==
Frankie and Patch are friends who work for the Great American Carnival, a small-time carnival that tours the South. Frankie does an act as The Mighty Bozo, a character who sits in a dunk tank insulting the crowd, while Patch takes the money and runs the game. Patch is also the show's "adjuster," hence his carny name, working with the owner of the carnival, Heavy St. John, negotiating deals with local officials and representatives of the local underworld to keep the show going.

What it takes to keep the show open varies from town to town. In one place, it is making good on a city official's gambling losses on the midway and giving a city councilor a pile of free passes. In another, it is having the strippers work, but not the freak show. In a third, an underworld boss's thug is provided a girl he fancies. Patch also works to maintain harmony among the carnies. He is good at his job, but never likes being played for a fool.

At one stand, Donna, an independent 18-year-old bored with small-town life, strikes up a friendship with Frankie and at his invitation follows the carny onto the carnival circuit. Patch is less than happy with her presence. To get Patch off her back, she takes a job with the strip show as a "side girl," a backup dancer who does not actually take her clothes off. Patch plants the suggestion with Delno, who runs the girlie show, that Donna wants to "work strong", i.e. be a stripper. When she is thrust onstage, she freezes and a brawl ensues. Afterwards, she takes the blame for Patch's setting her up to fail.

Frankie gets her a job in the string joint, one of the midway games, under the tutelage of Gerta. Donna is a big success, learning how to con the marks and get their money. After one successful scam, she winds up in bed with Patch, but they are caught by Frankie.

While this is going on, a con run by Nails on Skeet, the local crime boss's main enforcer, goes badly wrong. Upset at losing their money, the crooks wreck the Bozo Joint and kill On-Your-Mark, a longtime carny who had been planning to retire at the end of the season. Crime boss Marvin Dill comes after the carnival, intending to extort more money. However, Patch, Frankie, Donna and Heavy run a scam on Mr. Dill involving the apparent beheading of Skeet.

The Great American Carnival continues on its way, with Donna her own woman rather than Frankie's girlfriend. Frankie and Patch reconcile and rebuild the Bozo Joint. At the end of the movie, it is implied that Heavy St. John will retire in a couple of years, with Patch taking command of the show.

== Cast ==
- Gary Busey as Frankie
- Jodie Foster as Donna
- Robbie Robertson as "Patch"
- Meg Foster as Gerta
- Kenneth McMillan as "Heavy" St. John
- Elisha Cook Jr. as "On-Your-Mark"
- Tim Thomerson as "Doubles"
- Theodore Wilson as "Nails" (as Teddy Wilson)
- John Lehne as "Skeet"
- Bill McKinney as Marvin Dill
- Bert Remsen as Delno Baptiste
- Woodrow Parfrey as W.C. Hannon
- Alan Braunstein as Willie Mae
- Tina Andrews as "Sugaree"
- Craig Wasson as Mickey
- Fred Ward as Jamie
- Jordan Cael as "Flame", the headlining stripper
- Emmett Bejano as Alligator Skin Man
- Percilla Bejano as Monkey Girl
- Johann Petursson as Giant (as Johann Peterson)
- Pete Terhune as Petie, the Fire Eating Dwarf and Iron Tongue Act
- Elaina Doucet as Anatomical Contortionist
- Jimmy Rapp as Anatomical Contortionist and Sword Swallower

== Reception ==
Roger Ebert of the Chicago Sun-Times gave the film two stars out of four and wrote, "Carny is bursting with more information about American carnivals than it can contain, surrounding a plot too thin to support it. ...Inside this movie is a documentary struggling to get out." Gene Siskel awarded three-and-a-half stars out of four, calling Busey "superb" and stating, "There's a simple way to evaluate a film such as 'Carny,' a film so obviously in love with its subject, and that is whether it makes us want to attend a carnival. 'Carny' does." Vincent Canby of The New York Times wrote that the film had "nice performances" but was "not cohesive as it might be," because the filmmakers "appear to be unable to resist the colorful or bizarre material that leads nowhere." Variety declared, "An excitingly eccentric, nervously energetic work, 'Carny' is an intriguing look at an infrequently examined American subculture which emerges as more impressive in its various, sometimes brilliant parts than as a satisfying whole." Charles Champlin of the Los Angeles Times praised the "excellence of the acting" but thought the film ended "in a quite unsatisfactory way that leaves virtually nothing resolved and everyone compromised." Gary Arnold of The Washington Post wrote, "The material never does achieve dramatic coordination or resolution. Nevertheless, in a generous mood the seamy show-biz atmosphere may appear novel and compelling enough to justify patience with the shapeless, unfinished story."

Reviewing the film 30 years later, Dennis Swartz said, "The ambiance turns out to be much richer than the narrative, in this still intriguing misanthropic pic (freaks and outsiders against the ugly conventional world) that revels in the pleasure one gets in hustling someone at their con game."

Frederic and Mary Ann Brussat said of the movie in 2013, "Carny is a tightly structured, atmospherically rich little movie. Alex North's excellent music capitalizes on the exotic elements in the storyline. Busey is rambunctious as Frankie; Foster brings vitality to the role of Donna; and Robertson exudes a seething cynicism as Patch. Their tough, funny, and sad adventures on the road are rendered with a good mix of mystery and pathos."
