= Arthur Miller on Home Ground =

1979 Canadian film directed by Harry Rasky

- Directed by: Harry Rasky
- Written by: Harry Rasky
- Produced by: Harry Rasky
- Starring: Arthur Miller
- Cinematography: Kenneth W. Gregg; Hideaki Kobayashi; Edmund Long
- Edited by: Arla Saare
- Music by: Louis Applebaum
- Production company: Canadian Broadcasting Corporation
- Release date: September 1979 (FFM)
- Running time: 86 minutes
- Country: Canada
- Language: English

Arthur Miller on Home Ground is a Canadian documentary film, directed by Harry Rasky and released in 1979. The film is a biographical portrait of writer Arthur Miller, including interviews with many of the actors, who have appeared in theatrical productions or film adaptations of his work.

The film premiered at the 1979 Montreal World Film Festival, where it was the winner of the award for Most Popular Canadian Film. It was subsequently broadcast by CBC Television on October 19, 1979.
