= Harry Rasky =

Canadian film director (1928–2007)

- Born: 9 May 1928; Toronto, Ontario, Canada
- Died: 9 April 2007 (aged 78); Toronto, Ontario, Canada
- Resting place: Pardes Shalom Cemetery, Vaughan, Ontario, Canada
- Occupation: Film director

Harry Rasky, CM, O.Ont (9 May 1928 – 9 April 2007) was a Canadian documentary film director.

== Life and career ==
Rasky was born in Toronto, Ontario into a Jewish family, where he completed studies at Oakwood Collegiate Institute and then University College. He participated in CBC Television's first four years writing and producing CBC News Magazine (1952–1955). He also produced a documentary for the 1961 debut evening of CTV Television Network. He earned more than 200 awards during his career in which his films numbered more than 400.

In the late 1950s Rasky moved to New York where he was hired by towering figures in the broadcasting world such as Murrow and Cronkite. After learning the tricks of the trade Rasky became a freelance director and began to travel around the world documenting every inch of his journey. Throughout the 1960s Harry made films on Castro, Che Guevara, Lady Bird Johnson, Eleanor Roosevelt, the Nobel Prize Winners in 1964 (which included Martin Luther King Jr.) and many more individuals. He also made two wildly different docudramas entitled Hall of Kings, for which he won an Emmy Award, and Upon This Rock, which starred Orson Welles. His films were dubbed "Raskymentaries" by film critics, and noted for their poetry of the screen.

After making a film in Vietnam entitled Operation Sea War, Rasky decided that politics was not his area of interest. He decided to dedicate his filmmaking career to documenting the world's greatest creators. By the early 1970s Rasky returned to his native Toronto when the CBC offered him a simple arrangement: "make one film a year for us on whatever you want." Throughout the 70s, 80s, and 90s, he made films on figures such as Leonard Cohen, Marc Chagall, Henry Moore, Mikhail Baryshnikov, Teresa Stratas, Will and Ariel Durant, Christopher Plummer, Yousuf Karsh, Tennessee Williams, and Arthur Miller, as well as that covered a variety of issues including The War Against the Indians and The Spies That Never Were.

He published an autobiography, Nobody Swings on Sunday, in 1980. In 2003, he released an autobiographical documentary film about his childhood, of the same title.

He was named a member of the Order of Canada in 2003.

Rasky died in hospital of heart failure on 9 April 2007 while recovering from a hip fracture sustained at his home.

== Filmography ==
- Upon This Rock (1970)
- An Invitation to a Royal Wedding (1972)
- The Wit and World of George Bernard Shaw (1972)
- Tennessee Williams' South (1973)
- Next Year in Jerusalem (1974)
- Travels Through Life with Leacock (1975)
- Homage to Chagall: The Colours of Love (1977)
- The Peking Man Mystery (1977)
- Arthur Miller on Home Ground (1979)
- The Song of Leonard Cohen (1980)
- Being Different (1981)
- The Man Who Hid Anne Frank (1981)
- Stratasphere (1983)
- The Mystery of Henry Moore (1985)
- Karsh: The Searching Eye (1986)
- Dugas (1988)
- The Great Teacher: Northrop Frye (1989)
- The War Against the Indians (1992)
- Prophecy (1995)
- Nobody Swings on Sunday: The Many Lives and Films of Harry Rasky (2003)
- Modigliani: Body and Soul (2005)

== Awards and recognition ==
- 1966: Emmy Award for Hall of Kings
- 1977: Academy Award Nomination for Homage to Chagall: The Colours of Love
- 1984: Academy of Motion Picture Arts and Sciences – Certificate of Special Merit for "Stratasphere" (56th Academy Awards)
- 1985: Directors Guild of America Awards, Outstanding Directorial Achievement in Documentary/Actuality:, Homage to Chagall: The Colours of Love
- 1992: Margaret Collier Award
- 2002: appointed Member of the Order of Canada
