= Percilla Bejano =

Puerto Rican-American sideshow performer (1911–2001)

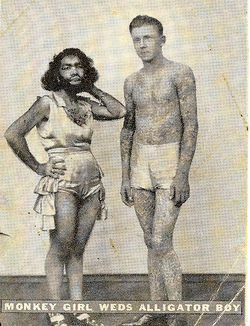
- Promotional photo of Percilla and Emmitt Bejano, captioned "Monkey Girl Weds Alligator Boy"
- Born: Percilla Román; April 26, 1911; Bayamón, Puerto Rico
- Died: February 5, 2001 (age 89); Tampa, Florida
- Other names: Percilla Lauther; Priscilla
- Occupations: Sideshow performer, showman, singer, dancer, actress
- Years active: 1910s—1990s
- Employers: Ripley's Believe It or Not; Johnny J. Jones; James E. Strates Shows
- Known for: Performing as "The Monkey Girl"
- Spouse: Emmitt Bejano (m. 1938–1995)
- Children: Francina Bejano; Tony Bejano
- Relatives: Carl Lauther (adoptive father)

Percilla Bejano (née Percilla Román; April 26, 1911 – February 5, 2001) was a Puerto Rican-American sideshow performer, singer, actress, and carnival attraction billed as The Monkey Girl (Spanish: La Chica Mono or La Mujer Mono). Born with hypertrichosis and hyperdontia, conditions that caused extensive hair growth and two rows of teeth, she was exhibited from childhood and became one of the best-known sideshow performers in North America.

Beginning her career in travelling exhibitions during the 1910s, Bejano performed for more than fifty years with major carnival and sideshow organizations including the Johnny J. Jones Exposition, Ripley's Believe It or Not!, and James E. Strates Shows. In 1938, she married fellow sideshow performer Emmitt Bejano, known as "Lobello, the Alligator Boy", and the pair became a long-running attraction promoted as "The World's Strangest Married Couple".

After largely retiring from touring, Bejano appeared in films, documentaries, and television programmes about sideshow culture, including Carny (1980) and Being Different (1981). She died in Tampa, Florida, in 2001.

== Early life ==
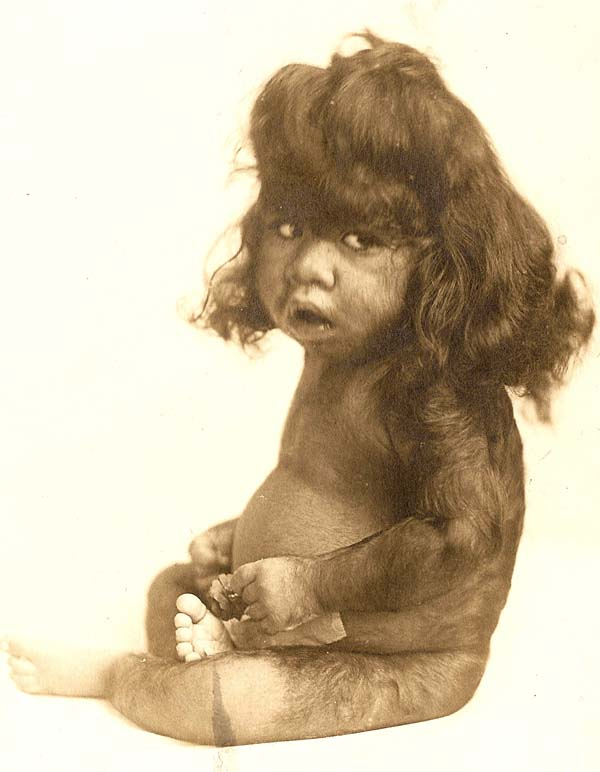
Percilla as a baby (ca. 1911)

Percilla Bejano was born Percilla Román in Bayamón, Puerto Rico, on April 26, 1911.

Bejano was born with hypertrichosis, a rare condition that caused excessive hair growth over much of her body, and hyperdontia, which gave her two rows of teeth.

As an infant, Bejano was taken to New York City, where physicians examined her for seven months in an effort to better understand her condition before she returned to Puerto Rico. According to later accounts, her family continued to consult physicians throughout her childhood, but no treatment or cure was found.

Although her conditions made her the subject of medical interest and public curiosity, Bejano remained healthy and built a career that lasted more than fifty years. In one of her pitch books, she reflected on her appearance, writing, "I'll grant my exterior appearance is strange and unusual but that does not hinder me from enjoying life to the fullest extent and from participating in the goodness life has to offer the same as yourself."

== Career ==
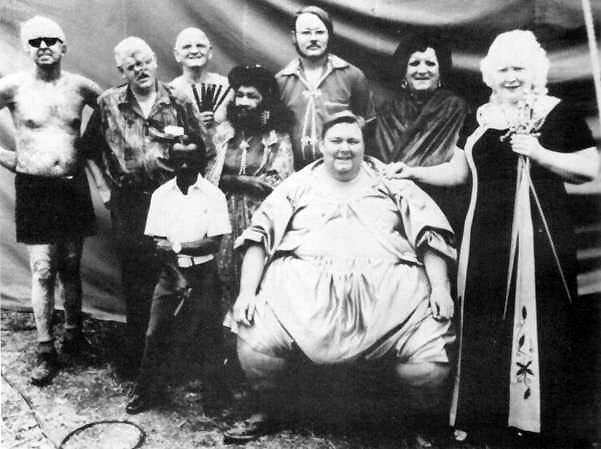
Group portrait of performers with the James E. Strates Shows sideshow, including (back row, from left) Emmitt Bejano, William "Bill" Durks, Percilla Bejano, and other unidentified performers, 1940.

Bejano began her exhibition career at age three, when her father started displaying her to help support their family of seven children. Her father later recruited showman Carl L. Lauther to help promote and manage her career. After her father's death, Bejano was adopted by Lauther and his wife, and she continued to perform under his management as "The Monkey Girl".

By the 1920s, she had become a successful sideshow attraction. In 1924, at age 13, she appeared with Lauther's European Wonders Show on the midway of the Rubin & Cherry Shows. Her popularity coincided with widespread public interest in evolutionary theory following the Scopes Trial, and she appeared in a staged attraction with a trained orangutan named Snooky in which the pair conducted a mock debate about evolution.

In 1936, at age 25, Lauther signed Bejano to perform with the Johnny J. Jones Exposition's "Oddities of the 20th Century" show. There she met fellow sideshow performer Emmitt Bejano, who was billed as "Lobello, the Alligator Boy".

After marrying Emmitt Bejano in 1938, the couple became a successful exhibition act and were promoted as "The World's Strangest Married Couple". In 1945, they left Lauther's show and joined a travelling Ripley's Believe It or Not! exhibit, where they performed under the stage names "Londo and Lobello". Their fellow performers included Joan Whisnant Beach, Clara Schazer ("Dolly Regan"), Grace McDaniels, and W. D. "Tiny" Cowan.

During the 1950s and 1960s, Percilla and Emmitt operated their own attraction, known as the Bejano Family, with Gooding Amusements. They later toured with James E. Strates Shows into the 1970s, continuing to perform even as traditional freak shows declined across North America.

In 1975, at age 64, Bejano reflected on her career in an interview with the Pensacola News Journal, saying, "I have fun at my work. I get to see you for nothing but you had to pay to see me."

After more than fifty years as a performer, Bejano and her husband had largely retired from touring by the 1980s. They continued to appear in films, documentaries, and television programmes about sideshow culture, including Carny (1980), Being Different (1981), and a 1992 episode of The Secret Cabaret.

== Marriage and family ==
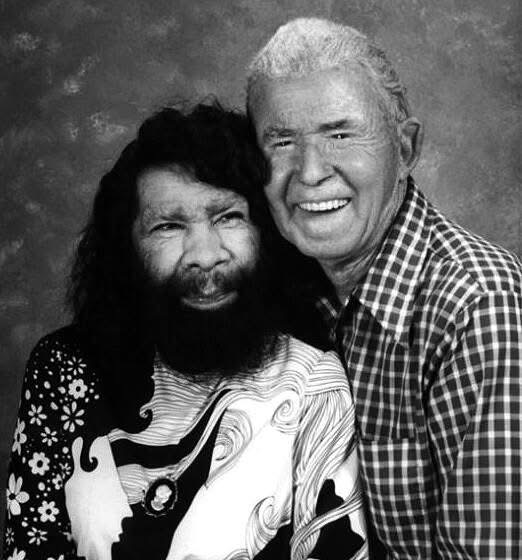
Percilla and Emmitt Bejano

While performing with the Johnny J. Jones Exposition, Percilla Bejano met fellow sideshow performer Emmitt Bejano, who was billed as "Lobello, the Alligator Boy". The couple met in 1936 and, according to later accounts, fell in love and eloped two years later despite the objections of Bejano's adoptive father, Carl L. Lauther.

Less than a year after their marriage, Bejano gave birth to a daughter, Francina, in Virginia on February 2, 1939. Like her mother, Francina was born with hypertrichosis, but she died of bronchopneumonia at the age of fourteen weeks.

More than a decade later, in the 1950s, Percilla and Emmitt adopted a son, Tony. The family lived on a ranch in Gibsonton, Florida, a community long associated with carnival and sideshow performers.

Percilla and Emmitt remained married for nearly 57 years and worked together in sideshows and travelling exhibitions for several decades. After retiring from show business, they settled in Tampa, Florida, where they spent the remainder of their lives together.

Following Emmitt's death on April 17, 1995, Bejano shaved her beard as a sign of mourning and remained clean-shaven for the final six years of her life. She outlived her husband by nearly six years, dying in Tampa on February 5, 2001.

== Legacy ==
After Emmitt's death, Percilla was interviewed for an E! True Hollywood Story episode in 2000 titled "The Murder of Lobster Boy". She also appeared as herself in the 1999 American documentary Sideshow: Alive on the Inside.
