= Jack Hayes (composer) =

American composer and film orchestrator

Jack J. Hayes (February 8, 1919 – August 24, 2011) was an American composer and film orchestrator, who worked uncredited on The Magnificent Seven. He was twice nominated for an Academy Award, for The Unsinkable Molly Brown in 1964 and for The Color Purple in 1985.
