= Alligator boy =

Sideshow performer with ichthyosis

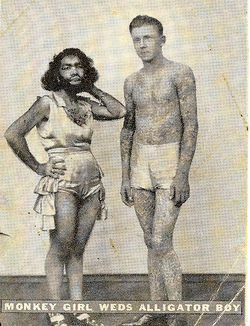
Promotional photo featuring Emmitt Bejano (right) as "Alligator Boy", next to his wife Percilla Bejano as "Monkey Girl"

An alligator boy (or girl, man, woman, as appropriate) was a common freak show and dime museum exhibit. While the act was traditionally performed by people with ichthyosis, sideshows sometimes substituted workers whose skin was covered in cracked glue, optionally supplemented with food dye and sand. As another alternative, taxidermist Julius S. Hansen advertised stuffed alligator boys for sale in 1887.

Like other freakshow performers, alligator boys were often depicted in banners and advertisements as half-human, half-animal hybrids. Their acts sometimes featured interactions with actual reptiles.

Alligator-skinned performers included:

- Esther Blackmon (1926–2003)
- William Parnell
- Emmitt Bejano
- John R. Williams
- Mildred D. Durks
- James and Henry Elam
- Mona Osanbaugh
- Christine Doto
