= The Color Purple (1985 film) =

1985 film by Steven Spielberg

- Theatrical release poster by John Alvin
- Directed by: Steven Spielberg
- Screenplay by: Menno Meyjes
- Based on: The Color Purple by Alice Walker
- Produced by: Kathleen Kennedy; Frank Marshall; Steven Spielberg; Quincy Jones
- Starring: Danny Glover; Adolph Caesar; Margaret Avery; Rae Dawn Chong; Whoopi Goldberg; Oprah Winfrey
- Cinematography: Allen Daviau
- Edited by: Michael Kahn
- Music by: Quincy Jones
- Production companies: Amblin Entertainment; The Guber-Peters Company
- Distributed by: Warner Bros.
- Release date: December 18, 1985 (United States)
- Running time: 154 minutes
- Country: United States
- Language: English
- Budget: $15 million
- Box office: $98.4 million

The Color Purple is a 1985 American epic period drama film, directed by Steven Spielberg and written by Menno Meyjes, based on the 1982 novel by Alice Walker. Spielberg's eighth film as a director, it marked a turning point in his career as it was a departure from the summer blockbusters for which he had become known. It is the first film directed by Spielberg for which John Williams did not compose the score, which was done by Quincy Jones instead. Jones also produced the film alongside Spielberg, Kathleen Kennedy and Frank Marshall. The film stars Whoopi Goldberg in her breakthrough role, along with Danny Glover, Oprah Winfrey (in her film debut), Margaret Avery, and Adolph Caesar.

Filmed in Anson and Union counties in North Carolina, The Color Purple tells the coming-of-age story of a young African-American girl named Celie Harris and the brutal experiences she endured including domestic violence, incest, child sexual abuse, poverty, racism, and sexism.

Upon its release by Warner Bros. on December 18, 1985, The Color Purple was a box office success, grossing $98.4 million against a budget of $15 million. The film received generally positive reviews from critics, with praise going to its acting (especially Goldberg's performance), direction, screenplay, musical score, and production values; criticism was directed by some for being "over-sentimental" and "stereotypical". The film was nominated for 11 Academy Awards, including Best Picture, but did not achieve a single win. It holds the record for most Oscar nominations without one for Best Director. It also received four Golden Globe Award nominations, with Goldberg winning Best Actress in a Drama. In 2006, the American Film Institute ranked the film 51st on its list of the most inspiring movies.

== Plot ==
Celie is an African American teenager in early 20th-century rural Georgia who twice has borne children by her abusive father, which were taken from her. He gives her away as a wife to Mister, who also abuses her, and his children mistreat her. Celie's loving younger sister, Nettie, runs away from their abusive father and seeks shelter with Celie. The sisters promise to write if they are separated. Mister attempts to rape Nettie, and he kicks her out after she fights him off.

Years later, Celie is meek from abuse. Mister's son Harpo marries Sofia, and Celie is shocked to find theirs to be a matriarchal household. Harpo attempts to overpower and strike Sofia, but he fails. Celie advises Harpo to beat Sofia, who retaliates and later confronts Celie, revealing her long history of abuse. She threatens to kill Harpo if he beats her again and tells Celie to do likewise to Mister. Harpo does not change, so Sofia leaves, taking their children with her.

Mister and Harpo bring home the ailing Shug Avery, a showgirl and Mister's long-time mistress. Celie, who has slowly developed a fondness for her through a photograph sent to Mister, is in awe of Shug's strong will. Celie nurses Shug back to health; Shug in turn takes a liking to her, writing and performing a song about her at Harpo's newly opened juke joint. Shug tells Celie she is moving to Memphis, and Celie confides to Shug that Mister beats her. Shug tells Celie she is beautiful and that she loves her, and they kiss. Celie packs her things to follow Shug to Memphis but gets caught by Mister.

Meanwhile, Sofia has been imprisoned for striking the town's mayor after he slaps her for speaking back to his wife Ms. Millie. Years pass, and she, now a shell of her former self, is released from prison – only to be immediately ordered by the judge to become a maid to Ms. Millie. Having not seen her children in eight years, Sofia is allotted Christmas to be with her family. When Ms. Millie tries to drive her, she panics and turns around after encountering a group of Sofia's family and friends, who were only trying to help her.

Shug returns to Celie and Mister's home with her new husband Grady, expecting to receive a recording contract. She gives Celie a letter from Nettie, who tells her that she is working for the couple who adopted Celie's children. Celie and Shug realize that Mister has been hiding Nettie's letters from Celie so, while he and Grady are out drinking, they search the house. They find a hidden compartment under the floorboards filled with dozens and dozens of Nettie's letters.

Engrossed in reading, Celie does not hear Mister's calls to shave him, so he beats her. She attempts to kill Mister with his straight razor, but Shug stops her. At a family gathering, Celie finally speaks up against Mister, putting a "curse" on him much to the delight of Shug and Sofia. This fighting spirit prompts Harpo's new wife Mary Agnes to stand up for herself as well. Shug and Grady drive away, taking Celie and Mary Agnes with them.

Years later, Mister is an old drunk and suffering alone while Harpo has made amends with Sofia; they now run the juke joint together, and Shug still performs there as a featured act. Upon Celie's father's death, she finally learns from Nettie's letters he was not their biological father. When their mother died, "his" property was legally inherited by Celie and Nettie. So, she receives the home and shop that had belonged to her father.

Celie begins to operate a tailor shop. When Mister receives a letter from Nettie addressed to Celie, he takes money from his secret stash, and arranges for Nettie, her husband, and Celie's children to return to the U.S. from Africa, where they had been living. While Mister watches from a distance, Celie, Nettie, and Celie's children reunite, and the two sisters bond over a hand-clapping game from their childhood.

== Cast ==
- Whoopi Goldberg as Celie Harris-Johnson
  - Desreta Jackson as young Celie Harris-Johnson
- Danny Glover as Albert "Mister" Johnson
- Adolph Caesar as Ol' Mister Johnson, Mister's father
- Margaret Avery as Shug Avery (singing voice by Táta Vega)
- Rae Dawn Chong as Mary "Squeak" Agnes
- Oprah Winfrey as Sofia
- Akosua Busia as Nettie Harris
- Willard Pugh as Harpo Johnson, Mister's son
  - Howard Starr as young Harpo Johnson
- Dana Ivey as Miss Millie
- Laurence Fishburne as Swain
- Carl Anderson as Rev. Samuel, Adam and Olivia's adoptive father
- John Patton Jr. as Preacher, Shug's father
- Bennet Guillory as Grady
- James Tillis as Henry Buster Broadnax
- Leonard Jackson as Papa Harris, Celie and Nettie's abusive stepfather

== Production ==
=== Development ===
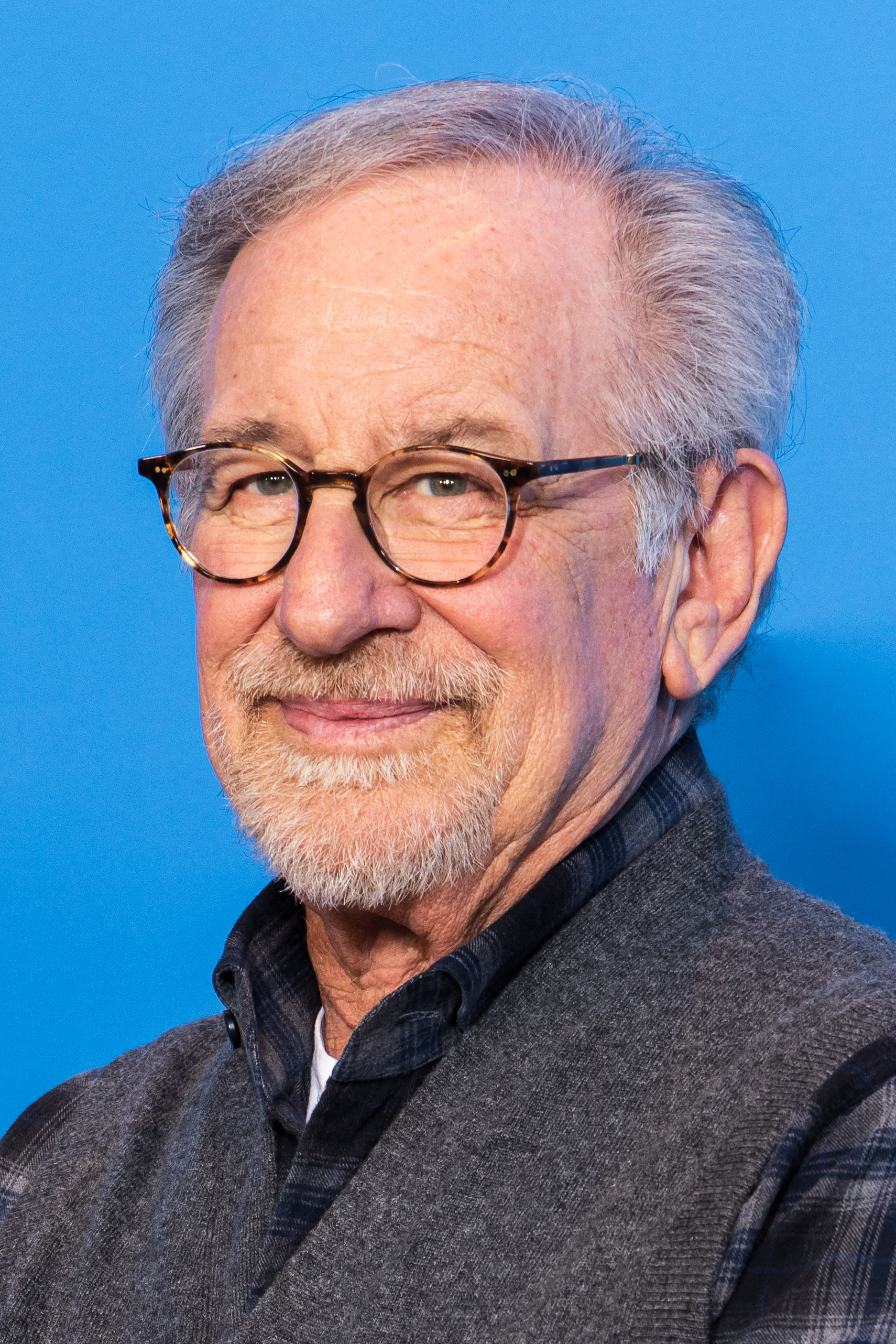
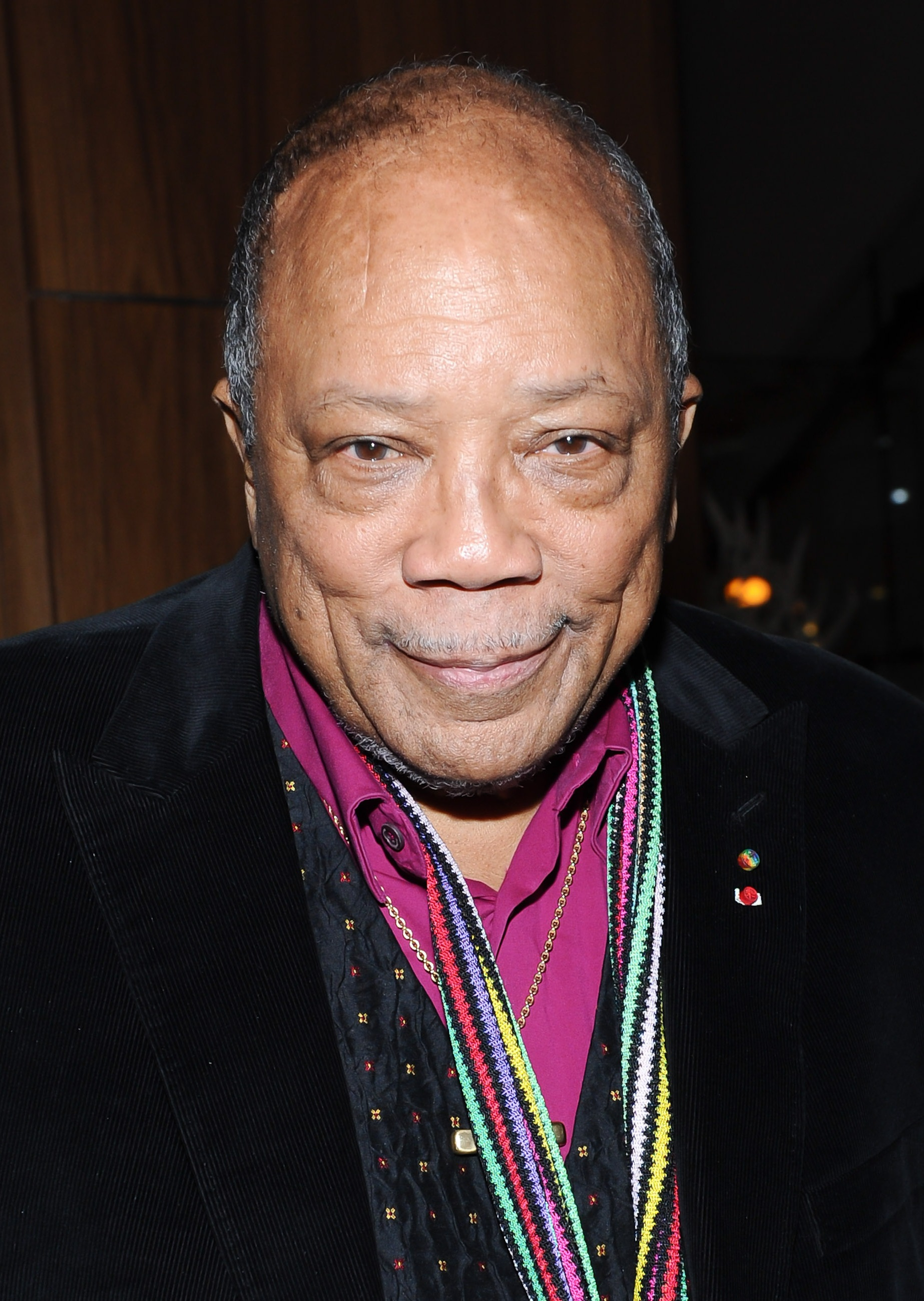
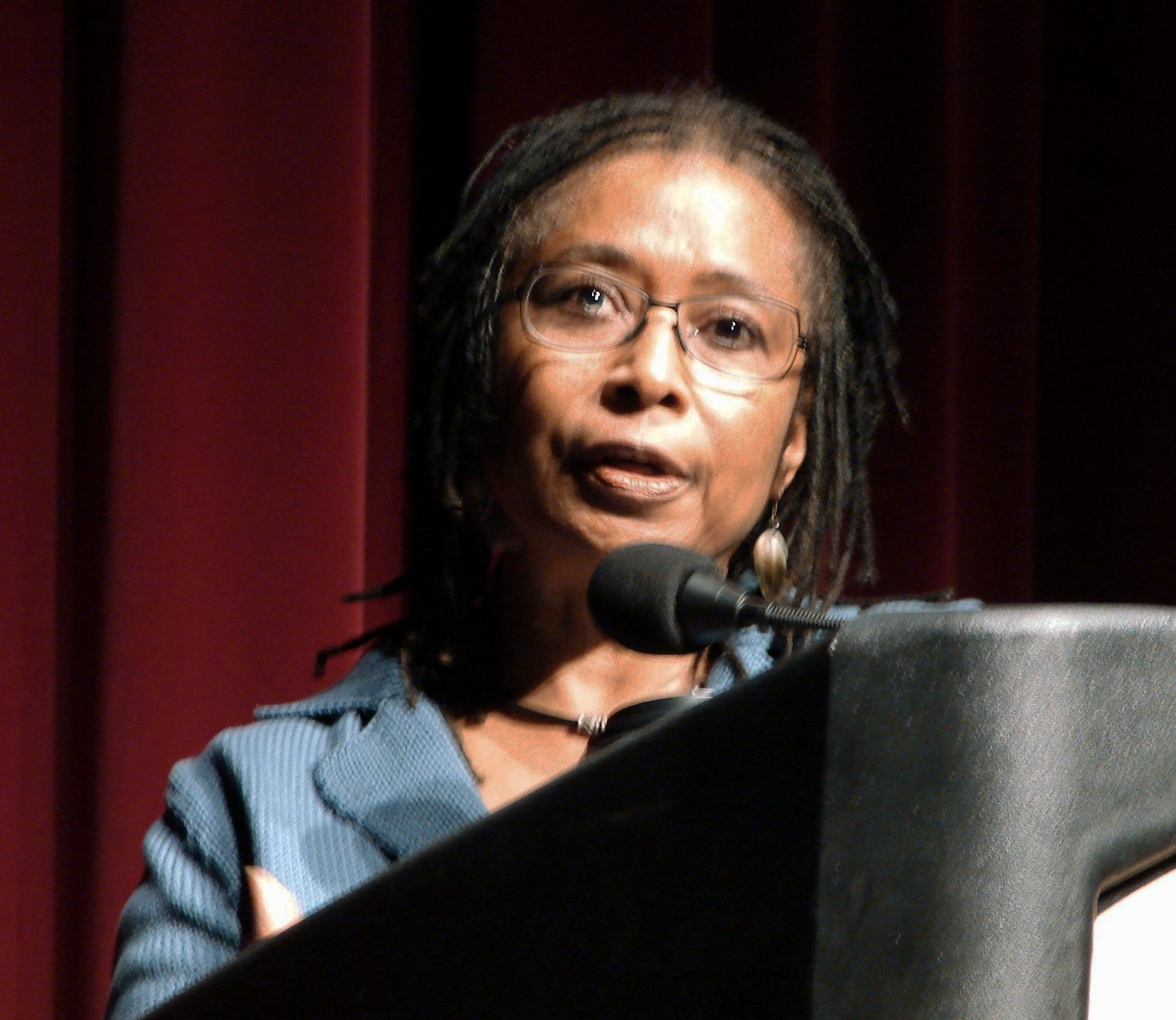
Director/co-producer Steven Spielberg (left), composer/co-producer Quincy Jones and author of the novel Alice Walker.

Alice Walker was initially reluctant to sell the film rights to her novel The Color Purple, due to Hollywood's portrayal of female and African American characters. She only agreed to executive producers Jon Peters and Peter Guber's offer after consulting with friends, who agreed the only way to improve representation of minorities was to work within the system. Walker's contract stipulated that she would serve as project consultant and that 50% of the production team, aside from the cast, would be African American, female or "people of the Third World".

Walker wrote an initial screenplay draft, but was replaced by Dutch-born writer Menno Meyjes, under the provision that she be given final script approval. Walker worked as an uncredited script doctor, and coached actors in their use of a Southern African American Vernacular English dialect.

Music mogul Quincy Jones, whose only prior film experience was as a composer, served as producer and approached Steven Spielberg to direct. Spielberg was initially reluctant to take the job, feeling his knowledge of the Deep South was inadequate and that the film should be directed by someone of color. Walker was likewise skeptical but was convinced otherwise after watching E.T. the Extra-Terrestrial. Spielberg waived his usual $15 million salary in lieu of the Directors Guild of America minimum of $40,000. He chose to play down the lesbian subtext between Celie and Shug, feeling that it would increase the rating if he did not.

=== Casting ===
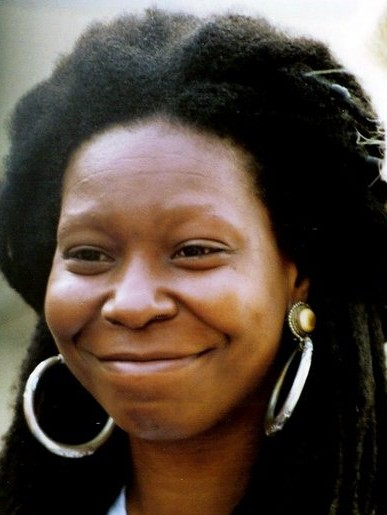
Whoopi Goldberg was known primarily as a stage performer when she was cast as Celie Harris.

Rather than cast established stars, Walker sought out lesser-known actors to play the principal roles, since their rise from obscurity represented the experience of characters in her novels. Whoopi Goldberg was a comedic stage performer who had starred in an acclaimed one-woman show on Broadway but whose only prior film role was in a 1982 avant-garde film, Citizen: I'm Not Losing My Mind, I'm Giving It Away.

In her 2024 memoir Bits and Pieces, Whoopi revealed she sent a letter to Alice Walker at the encouragement of her daughter after enjoying Walker's readings of the novel on the radio. As Whoopi was relatively unknown in the mainstream at the time she was shocked to receive a reply from Walker who indicated she was not only aware of Whoopi's stage work but she had put her on Quincy Jones and Steven Spielberg's radar ahead of casting talks. Oprah Winfrey was a radio and television host without prior acting experience, who was hired at Jones's insistence.

Oprah later said she had chosen the film as it had special meaning in her life. After lobbying producers for the part, 29-year-old Goldberg was personally selected by Walker after she saw her stand-up. Goldberg's audition for Spielberg, where both Jones and Michael Jackson were present, saw her perform a routine involving a stoned E.T. being arrested for drug possession.

Other cast members, such as Danny Glover, Adolph Caesar, and Carl Anderson, were predominantly stage performers. Akosua Busia was a graduate of the Royal Central School of Speech and Drama, and the daughter of Ghanaian prime minister Kofi Abrefa Busia. Goldberg's real-life daughter Alex Martin has a minor role as one of the children in the Easter sequence.

Margaret Avery was a veteran actress who had previously won an NAACP Image Award for the made-for-television film Louis Armstrong – Chicago Style. Spielberg had pursued singers Chaka Khan and Tina Turner but both turned it down. Patti LaBelle and Sheryl Lee Ralph also auditioned, and Phyllis Hyman was considered. Though Avery had prior musical experience, her singing voice was dubbed by Táta Vega.

=== Filming ===
While the novel was based on Walker's childhood home of Eatonton, Georgia, the film was shot predominantly in James C. Bennett's house, located in Lilesville (Anson County), and Union County in North Carolina during the summer months. Sets were constructed at an Antebellum-era plantation outside Wadesboro, while the town of Marshville had its paved roads covered in mud and clay to match the early 20th-century setting. The church was a real 60-year-old Baptist chapel that was moved piece-by-piece from its original location. Due to the summer heat, the winter sequences were shot with fabricated snow. Additional scenes were filmed on the Universal Studios Hollywood backlot, and a second unit led by Frank Marshall traveled to Kenya to shoot scenes in Nairobi and in the Maasai regions. Principal photography began on June 5, 1985.

Spielberg encouraged both Goldberg and Winfrey to ad lib during filming, including Sofia's speech at the dinner table. Quincy Jones' insistence on giving more dialogue to Winfrey sparked an apparent feud between her and Goldberg that lasted several years afterwards.

== Soundtrack ==
The Color Purple's film score was written by Quincy Jones, the first feature film directed by Spielberg for which John Williams did not compose the music. The score combines elements of classical and period jazz, blues, and gospel, and features several popular songs of the era. The track "Miss Celie's Blues (Sister)", performed in the film by the character Shug (Avery; dubbed by Táta Vega), later gained popularity as a concert piece.

Due to his dual responsibilities as both producer and composer, Jones delegated many of the tasks to a team of eleven other musicians and arrangers. This led to a dispute during the Academy Awards over the nominees for Best Original Score. While Jones is the sole credited composer of the film, the nomination lists all twelve musicians (Jones, Chris Boardman, Jorge Calandrelli, Andraé Crouch, Jack Hayes, Jerry Hey, Randy Kerber, Jeremy Lubbock, Joel Rosenbaum, Caiphus Semenya, Fred Steiner and Rod Temperton).

== Release ==
The Color Purple premiered on December 18, 1985, in Los Angeles. However, the premiere was picketed by members of the NAACP for its depiction of rape. The film went into general release in the United States on February 7, 1986. It was also shown at the 1986 Cannes Film Festival as a non-competing title.

== Reception ==
=== Box office ===
The Color Purple was a success at the box office, staying in U.S. theaters for 21 weeks, and grossing over $98.4 million worldwide. In terms of box office income, it ranked as the number one rated PG-13 film released in 1985, and number four overall.

=== Critical response ===
Alice Walker discusses the film
from the BBC programme Desert Island Discs, May 19, 2013

On review aggregator Rotten Tomatoes, the film holds an approval rating of 73% based on 125 reviews, with an average rating of 7.6/10. The website's critical consensus reads: "It might have been better served by a filmmaker with a deeper connection to the source material, but The Color Purple remains a worthy, well-acted adaptation of Alice Walker's classic novel." On Metacritic, the film received a weighted average score of 78 out of 100 based on seven critics, indicating "generally favorable reviews".

Roger Ebert of the Chicago Sun-Times awarded the film four stars, calling it "the year's best film". He also praised Whoopi Goldberg, calling her role "one of the most amazing debut performances in movie history" and predicting she would win the Academy Award for Best Actress; she was nominated but lost to Geraldine Page, for her performance in The Trip to Bountiful. Ebert wrote of The Color Purple:

The world of Celie and the others is created so forcibly in this movie that their corner of the South becomes one of those movie places – like Oz, like Tara, like Casablanca – that lay claim to their own geography in our imaginations. The affirmation at the end of the film is so joyous that this is one of the few movies in a long time that inspires tears of happiness, and earns them.

Ebert's long-time television collaborator, Gene Siskel of the Chicago Tribune, praised the film as "triumphantly emotional and brave", calling it Spielberg's "successful attempt to enlarge his reputation as a director of youthful entertainments." Siskel wrote that The Color Purple was "a plea for respect for black women." Although acknowledging that the film was a period drama, he praised its "... incredibly strong stand against the way black men treat black women. Cruel is too kind a word to describe their behavior. The principal black men in The Color Purple use their women – both wives and daughters – as sexual chattel."

The New York Times film critic Janet Maslin noted the film's divergence from Walker's book, but made the case that this shift works:

Mr. Spielberg has looked on the sunny side of Miss Walker's novel, fashioning a grand, multi-hanky entertainment that is as pretty and lavish as the book is plain. If the book is set in the harsh, impoverished atmosphere of rural Georgia, the movie unfolds in a cozy, comfortable, flower-filled wonderland. ... Some parts of it are rapturous and stirring, others hugely improbable, and the film moves unpredictably from one mode to another. From another director, this might be fatally confusing, but Mr. Spielberg's showmanship is still with him. Although the combination of his sensibilities and Miss Walker's amounts to a colossal mismatch, Mr. Spielberg's Color Purple manages to have momentum, warmth and staying power all the same.

James Greenberg for Variety found the film over-sentimental, writing, "there are some great scenes and great performances in The Color Purple, but it is not a great film. Steven Spielberg's turn at 'serious' film-making is marred in more than one place by overblown production that threatens to drown in its own emotions."

Filmmaker Oliver Stone praised the film, saying it is "an excellent movie, and it was an attempt to deal with an issue that had been overlooked, and it wouldn't have been done if it hadn't been Spielberg. And it's not like everyone says, that he ruined the book. That's horseshit. Nobody was going to do the book. He made the book live again." In 2004, Ebert included The Color Purple in his book series The Great Movies. He stated that "I can see its flaws more easily than when I named it the best film of 1985, but I can also understand why it moved me so deeply, and why the greatness of some films depends not on their perfection or logic, but on their heart."

In 2019, actress and singer Cynthia Erivo, who played Celie in the 2015 Broadway revival of the stage musical adaptation, named it as one of her five favorite films, saying that it "changed her life."

=== Controversy ===
Some critics alleged that the film stereotyped black people in general and black men in particular, pointing to the fact that Spielberg had directed a predominantly African-American story. In response, Spielberg said, "Most of the criticism came from directors [who] felt that we had overlooked them, and that it should have been a black director telling a black story. That was the main criticism. The other criticism was that I had softened the book. I have always copped to that. I made the movie I wanted to make from Alice Walker's book. There were certain things in the [lesbian] relationship between Shug Avery and Celie that were finely detailed in Alice's book, that I didn't feel could get a [PG-13] rating. And I was shy about it. In that sense, perhaps I was the wrong director to acquit some of the more sexually honest encounters between Shug and Celie, because I did soften those. I basically took something that was extremely erotic and very intentional, and I reduced it to a simple kiss. I got a lot of criticism for that."

During the time and since then it has had an intense debate among civil rights activists, commentators, and film critics. The NAACP accused the film of "stereotypical portrayals of black males". Clarence Page of the Chicago Tribune wrote, "It was a debate that divided much of the nation's black intelligentsia against itself". Author James Baldwin accused the movie and its director, Steven Spielberg, of mangling the poetic vision of Alice Walker's Pulitzer Prize-winning novel. Black feminist Michele Wallace said the movie "smothered Walker's feminist message in syrupy Disney-like sentimentality". Black author Ishmael Reed called the book a "near-criminal assault on black family life and heterosexual relationships."

In 2022, writer Aisha Harris revisited the controversy on NPR's Pop Culture Happy Hour saying, "when it first came out, there was a lot of tension and debate about how it depicted Black men and Black women and the Black family". Harris later detailed, "nearly all of the Black men in the movie are depicted as cold-hearted, violent abusers. To some audiences, especially Black men, The Color Purple was the mainstream reinforcement of a deeply damaging and persistent perception".

The film was fiercely defended by its stars including Winfrey who said, "It's one woman's story. It was not meant to be the history of every black man or woman in this country and I wish they'd just shut up about it". Goldberg said "We got a lot of shit from a lot of people [and] the NAACP... I was really pissed off. [Spielberg] made a damn fine film".

== Accolades ==
The Color Purple was nominated for 11 Academy Awards (including Best Picture, Best Actress for Goldberg and Best Supporting Actress for both Avery and Winfrey). It failed to win any of them, tying the record set by 1977's The Turning Point for the most Oscar nominations without a single win. Some organizations such as the NAACP protested against the decision of the Academy of Motion Picture Arts and Sciences to not award the film any categories.

Steven Spielberg received his first Directors Guild of America Award at the 38th awards ceremony for Outstanding Directorial Achievement in Motion Pictures. He became the first director to win the award without even being nominated for the Academy Award for Best Director.

Award	Category	Nominee(s)	Result
Academy Awards	Best Picture	Steven Spielberg, Kathleen Kennedy, Frank Marshall, and Quincy Jones	Nominated
Academy Awards	Best Actress	Whoopi Goldberg	Nominated
Academy Awards	Best Supporting Actress	Margaret Avery	Nominated
Academy Awards	Best Supporting Actress	Oprah Winfrey	Nominated
Academy Awards	Best Screenplay – Based on Material from Another Medium	Menno Meyjes	Nominated
Academy Awards	Best Art Direction	Art Direction: J. Michael Riva and Bo Welch; Set Decoration: Linda DeScenna	Nominated
Academy Awards	Best Cinematography	Allen Daviau	Nominated
Academy Awards	Best Costume Design	Aggie Guerard Rodgers	Nominated
Academy Awards	Best Makeup	Ken Chase	Nominated
Academy Awards	Best Original Score	Chris Boardman, Jorge Calandrelli, Andraé Crouch, Jack Hayes, Jerry Hey, Quincy Jones, Randy Kerber, Jeremy Lubbock, Joel Rosenbaum, Caiphus Semenya, Fred Steiner, and Rod Temperton	Nominated
Academy Awards	Best Original Song	"Miss Celie's Blues"; Music by Quincy Jones and Rod Temperton; Lyrics by Quincy Jones, Rod Temperton, and Lionel Richie	Nominated
All Def Movie Awards	Most Quoted Movie		Nominated
Artios Awards	Best Casting for Feature Film – Drama	Reuben Cannon	Won
ASCAP Film and Television Music Awards	Top Box Office Films	Chris Boardman, Jorge Calandrelli, Andraé Crouch, Jack Hayes, Quincy Jones, Joel Rosenbaum, Fred Steiner, and Rod Temperton	Won
Black Movie Awards	Classic Cinema Hall of Fame		Won
Blue Ribbon Awards	Best Foreign Film	Steven Spielberg	Won
British Academy Film Awards	Best Adapted Screenplay	Menno Meyjes	Nominated
British Society of Cinematographers Awards	Best Cinematography in a Theatrical Feature Film	Allen Daviau	Nominated
Directors Guild of America Awards	Outstanding Directorial Achievement in Motion Pictures	Steven Spielberg	Won
Golden Globe Awards	Best Motion Picture – Drama		Nominated
Golden Globe Awards	Best Director – Motion Picture	Steven Spielberg	Nominated
Golden Globe Awards	Best Actress in a Motion Picture – Drama	Whoopi Goldberg	Won
Golden Globe Awards	Best Supporting Actress – Motion Picture	Oprah Winfrey	Nominated
Golden Globe Awards	Best Original Score – Motion Picture	Quincy Jones	Nominated
Heartland Film Festival	Truly Moving Picture	Steven Spielberg	Won
Japan Academy Film Prize	Outstanding Foreign Language Film		Nominated
Kansas City Film Critics Circle Awards	Best Director	Steven Spielberg	Won
Los Angeles Film Critics Association Awards	Best Actress	Whoopi Goldberg	Runner-up
Los Angeles Film Critics Association Awards	Best Supporting Actress	Oprah Winfrey	Runner-up
Los Angeles Film Critics Association Awards	New Generation Award	Whoopi Goldberg	Runner-up
NAACP Image Awards	Outstanding Motion Picture		Won
NAACP Image Awards	Outstanding Actress in a Motion Picture	Whoopi Goldberg	Won
National Board of Review Awards	Top Ten Films		Won
National Board of Review Awards	Best Film		Won
National Board of Review Awards	Best Actress	Whoopi Goldberg	Won
Online Film & Television Association Awards	Film Hall of Fame: Productions		Inducted
Writers Guild of America Awards	Best Screenplay – Based on Material from Another Medium	Menno Meyjes	Nominated

=== American Film Institute ===
- AFI's 100 Years... 100 Cheers - #51

== Musical film adaptation ==
On November 2, 2018, it was announced that a film adaptation of the 2005 stage musical version was in development. Spielberg and Jones returned to co-produce, alongside the stage production's producers Winfrey and Scott Sanders. In August 2020, it was announced that Marcus Gardley would pen the screenplay and The Burial of Kojo's Blitz Bazawule would direct. In December 2020, it was announced that Alice Walker, Rebecca Walker, Kristie Macosko Krieger, Carla Gardini and Mara Jacobs would executive produce. H.E.R. and Corey Hawkins were cast in August 2021. The film was released on December 25, 2023.

Although the film performed unsuccessfully at the box office, it received positive reviews from critics and received numerous accolades, including a nomination for Danielle Brooks in Best Supporting Actress at the 96th Academy Awards as well as nominations for two Golden Globe Awards, two BAFTA Awards, two Screen Actors Guild Award, and five Critics' Choice Awards. It also earned 19 nominations at the 2024 Black Reel Awards, winning nine; both totals were a record for a musical.

== See also ==
- List of American films of 1985
- The Color Purple (musical), the musical theatre version of the novel.
- The Color Purple (2023 film)
