= Desreta Jackson =

American actress

- Born: April 19, 1971 (age 55); Tortola, British Virgin Islands
- Occupation: Actress
- Years active: 1985–present
- Known for: Actress; Founder, Black Silk Products
- Notable work: The Color Purple
- Website: http://desretajackson.com/

Desreta Jackson (born April 19, 1971) is a Virgin Islander actress, producer and entrepreneur. She is best known for her role as Young Celie in the movie The Color Purple.

== Early life and education ==
Jackson was born in Tortola in the British Virgin Islands and migrated to the United States at the age of nine. Her family settled in a skid row area of Los Angeles and her mother collected cans to support her. After two years, her mother found housing in South Central Los Angeles. After acting in a scene in a school play, she told her mother that she wanted to take drama classes. Her mother enrolled her in acting classes to keep her away from gang activity where they lived in California.

After various roles in television and movies, Jackson earned a degree in directing from Los Angeles City College.

== Acting career ==
Jackson's career began after only a short time in acting school. She was at a casting call for The Color Purple when she was spotted by the producer Reuben Cannon and she was called back for more casting calls. She was given the role of the young Celie Harris (with Whoopi Goldberg as adult Celie), who is forced to marry a wealthy young local widower (Danny Glover) who abuses her.

Jackson continued her career with roles in both television and film.

=== Filmography ===
Year	Title	Role	Notes
1985	The Color Purple	Young Celie	
1987	Mighty Pawns	Lucy	Made-for-TV movie starring Rosalind Cash, Shawn Harrison, and Desreta Jackson.
1989	Mancuso, F.B.I.		Appeared in episode 2 ("Racial Matters"), broadcast on October 19, 1989.
1992	Sister Act	Teenage Girl	Minor role
2008	Creating Celebrity	Self / Producer	

=== Theater ===
Year	Title	Role	Notes
1995	Andie		
1996	Alien Garden		

== Personal life ==
Jackson is the founder of BlackSilk Products, a hair care product company that she launched in 2011. She began the business from home in 2002, making her own hair care products such as oils, hair treatments, shampoos and conditioners.
