= Johnny Jones Exposition =

Traveling railroad show

The Johnny Jones Exposition was a traveling railroad show of midway entertainment stages, rows of concessions and amusement rides and one of the largest collective amusements in the United States.

== Show details ==
The Johnny J. Jones Exposition traveled to fairgrounds throughout the continental United States and Canada for over 50 years. The Ringling Bros. and Barnum & Bailey Circus was the only show in America that was bigger than the Johnny Jones Exposition. The Johnny J. Jones Exposition was founded by Johnny J. Jones, a prominent showman in the America's carnival industry, and headquartered in DeLand, Florida. Jones began his carnival enterprises in 1895 and the Johnny J. Jones Exposition was managed by the Jones family until 1951 when the IRS seized and sold the equipment for taxes.

== Bibliography ==
- Bob Goldsack, “A History of the Johnny J. Jones Exposition: ‘The Mighty Monarch of the Tented World’”, Midway Museum Publications, Nashua, NH. (1990)
- Joe McKennon, “The Pictorial History of the American Carnival, Volume II”, Carnival Publishers of Sarasota, Florida (1972)
- Fred Dahlinger, Jr., “Show Trains of the 20th Century”, Circus World Museum (2002)
