= Jóhann K. Pétursson =

Icelandic circus performer and actor

- Jóhann K. Pétursson with Kristján Eldjárn
- Born: Jóhann Kristinn Pétursson; 9 February 1913; Akureyri, Danish Iceland
- Died: 26 November 1984 (aged 71); Dalvík, Iceland
- Other names: The Nordic Giant Olaf; The Icelandic Giant; The Viking Giant
- Occupations: Circus performer, actor
- Height: 2.34 m (7 ft 8 in)

Jóhann Kristinn Pétursson (Icelandic pronunciation: [ˈjouːhanː ˈkrɪstɪn ˈpʰjɛːtʏr̥sɔn]; 9 February 1913 – 26 November 1984), also known as the Icelandic Giant and the Viking Giant, was an Icelandic circus performer and actor who at his peak measured 2.34 metres (7 ft 8 in) in height and weighed 163 kilograms (359 lb).

== Early life ==
Jóhann was born in Akureyri, Danish-ruled Iceland on 9 February 1913, as the third of nine children in his family. The same year his family moved to Dalvík. At four years old the family moved to Svarfaðardalur. Later he would be known as Jóhann Svarfdælingur (a Demonym for people from Svarfaðardalur).

Jóhann had a normal development until the age of 15, after which he experienced accelerated growth. At the age of 17, he was very strong and reportedly could lift a lorry, but had back and joint issues and difficulty walking by age 20. In 1935, he was studied by Knud Krabbe in Copenhagen, who recorded his height at 2.205 metres (7 ft 2.8 in) and his weight at 135 kilograms (298 lb) but doubted that he had acromegaly as his body was proportional and there was no sign of hypogonadism. However, he had an enlarged sella turcica. He was re-examined in Leipzig in 1939, measuring at 2.225 metres (7 ft 3.6 in).

== Career ==
Due to his physical ailments, Jóhann was unable to find normal employment and instead toured Europe's vaudeville theatres, doing so until the outbreak of World War II. He was in Copenhagen during the German invasion of Denmark and remained there until the end of the war, working in a shipyard. In 1948, he was invited to move to the United States by the Ringling Bros. and Barnum & Bailey Circus. The tallest Icelandic man on record, his home, living trailer, vehicles, furniture, and clothing were all custom-made.

During his career, he used the stage name "der Nordische Riese Olaf" ("the Nordic Giant Olaf") in Germany, and "the Icelandic Giant" or "the Viking Giant" in the U.S. In addition to being a circus performer, he acted in several movies, such as Prehistoric Women. Early on in his career, he often wore a suit and top hat, but with the Ringling brothers he dressed as a stereotypical Viking, sporting a full beard and horned helmet. Billed at 2.64 metres (8 ft 8 in), he initially made US$200 (US$2,050 in 2017) per week when he came to the United States in 1948, but soon gained popularity and became an independent attraction, earning over US$1,000 (US$9,000 in 2017) per week by the mid-1950s.

A prominent member of the Tampa Showmen's Association (TSA) and the International Independent Showmen's Association (IISA), he was involved in their charitable activities. His memory is honoured with personal belongings displayed in the Showmen's Museum of the IISA in Gibsonton, Florida.

== Later life and death ==
He retired in 1963 and moved to Florida. He married and had one child, of average height. He spoke four languages: Icelandic, Danish, German and English. In 1981, he was profiled in the documentary film Being Different.

After a fall in Tampa, Florida in 1984, he returned to his birthplace Dalvík, where he died a few months later at the age of 71. He is buried in Dalvík.
