= Johnny J. Jones =

American carnival showman (1874–1930)

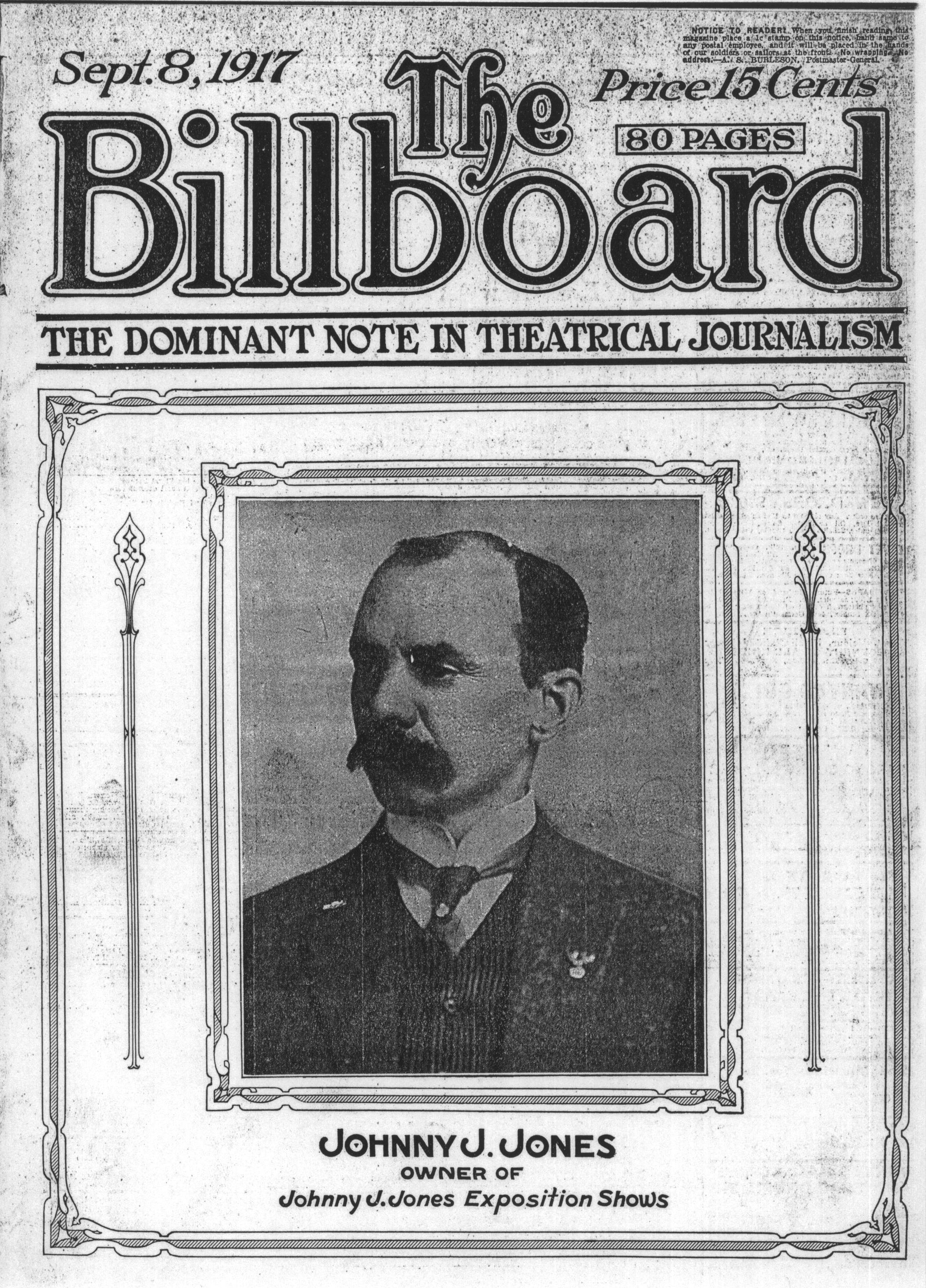
Johnny J. Jones, The Billboard, 1917

Johnny J. Jones (June 8, 1874 – December 25, 1930) was an American carnival showman, the founder and manager of the Johnny J. Jones Exposition. The Exposition was one of the first to use steel railroad cars and one of the largest of its kind, exceeded in size only by the Ringling Bros. and Barnum & Bailey Circus. In operation for over 50 years through the continental United States and Canada, the show reached a total of 50 steel cars carrying 100 wagons during its heyday in the 1920s.

== Personal life ==
A native of Arnot, Tioga County, Pennsylvania, Jones was the son of Welsh immigrants, working alongside his father in the local coal mines from the age of ten. He graduated to hawking newspapers first on the streets and then aboard the Pennsylvania Railroad passenger train, where he also sold sandwiches, cigars and sundries. DuBois, Pennsylvania historian Major Israel McCreight recalled: “After the arrival of the 1 o'clock train Johnny J. Jones could be heard yelling at the top of his voice, "Pittsburgh Gazette; all about the big fire."

Jones wed Etta Louise "Hody" Hurd in 1920 and fathered a son, Johnny J. Jones Jr. (1921). In his mid-40s at the time, he would not have long with his family. Jones had developed an alcohol problem in his youth, and in the mid 1920s was hospitalized for alcoholism. The impact on his health was profound. He died of renal failure at the age of 56 on Christmas Day in 1930.

== Carnival career ==
Jones entered the carnival business in 1895 with his purchase of a cane rack booth at a local fairground and opened his first small traveling fair in 1899. Localized to Western Pennsylvania, The Johnny J. Jones Ferris Wheel Company featured a miniature railroad and Ferris wheel among its entertainments. Jones's carnival evolved to become the "Johnny J. Jones Exposition Shows & Trained Wild Animal Exhibition" in 1906 when he added a circus, and he began touring regionally through the Eastern United States and Canada. In 1916, he expanded into the west.

His fame grew along with his program; in 1917, he was featured on the covers of Billboard and Optimist magazines. Jones had a reputation for running a clean operation, suitable for children. By 1928, Jones had two traveling carnivals. He combined these into the second-largest traveling show in America, the 50 car, 100-wagon exhibition coming in behind Ringling Bros. and Barnum & Bailey Circus.

According to Dr. Beckwith "Johnny was always proud of his hometown. For years, the side of his train cars and his show wagons were lettered : "From the Capital of the World, DuBois, Pennsylvania"

In 1929, Jones made national press again when he paid $2,000 to fly a female gorilla into the United States from France. Susie the Gorilla was not only the only female gorilla in the United States at the time, but the first gorilla in the world to be trained. Her twice daily performances featured her eating with a knife and fork. Susie was featured in the Johnny J. Jones Exposition, the Miller Brothers 101 Ranch and the Ringling Bros. and Barnum & Bailey Circus before permanently relocating to the Cincinnati Zoo and Botanical Garden in 1931.

Jones suffered badly during the Great Depression. During the 1930s, debts amassed, but the show survived his death on 25 December 1930. His family continued the show without him, Hody Hurd Jones managing the Exposition until 1950, with the help (aside from a military stint in World War II of the couple's son. It could not be sustained forever and closed with a final show in DuBois, Pennsylvania. In 1951, the IRS sold its equipment to satisfy tax debt.

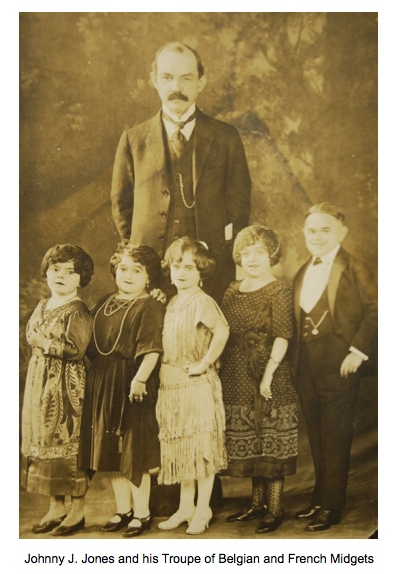
Johnny J. Jones and his Troupe of Belgian and French Midgets

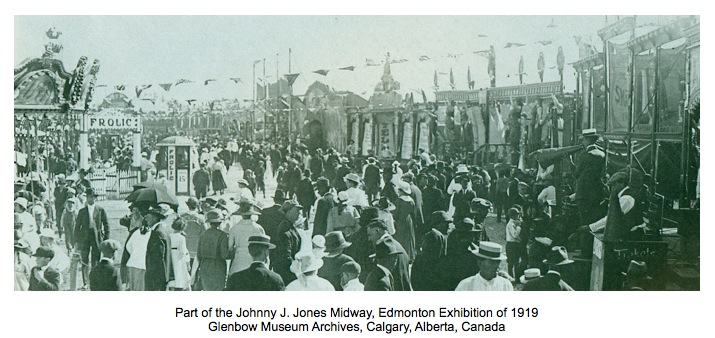
Johnny J. Jones Midway, Edmonton Exhibition of 1919, Glenbow Museum Archives, Alberta, Canada

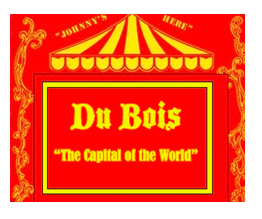
The sign honoring DuBois, Pennsylvania on the show

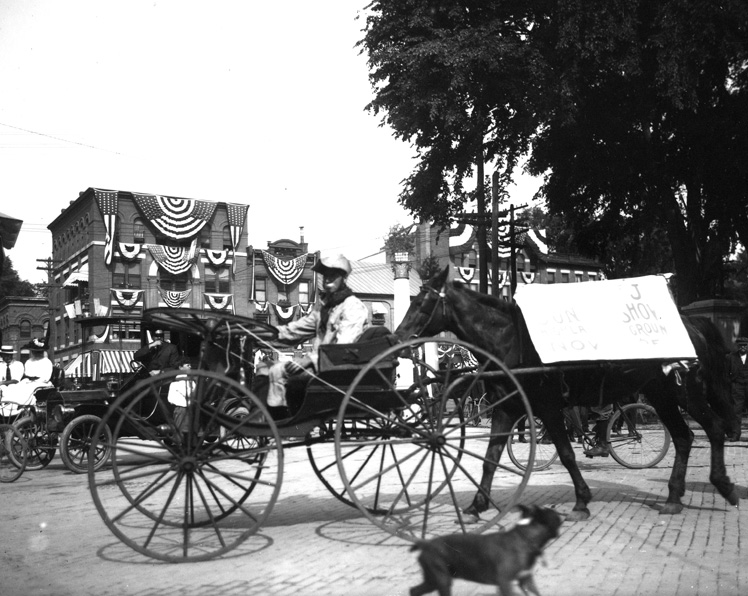
Advertisement for Johnny J Jones Show with the cart before the horse

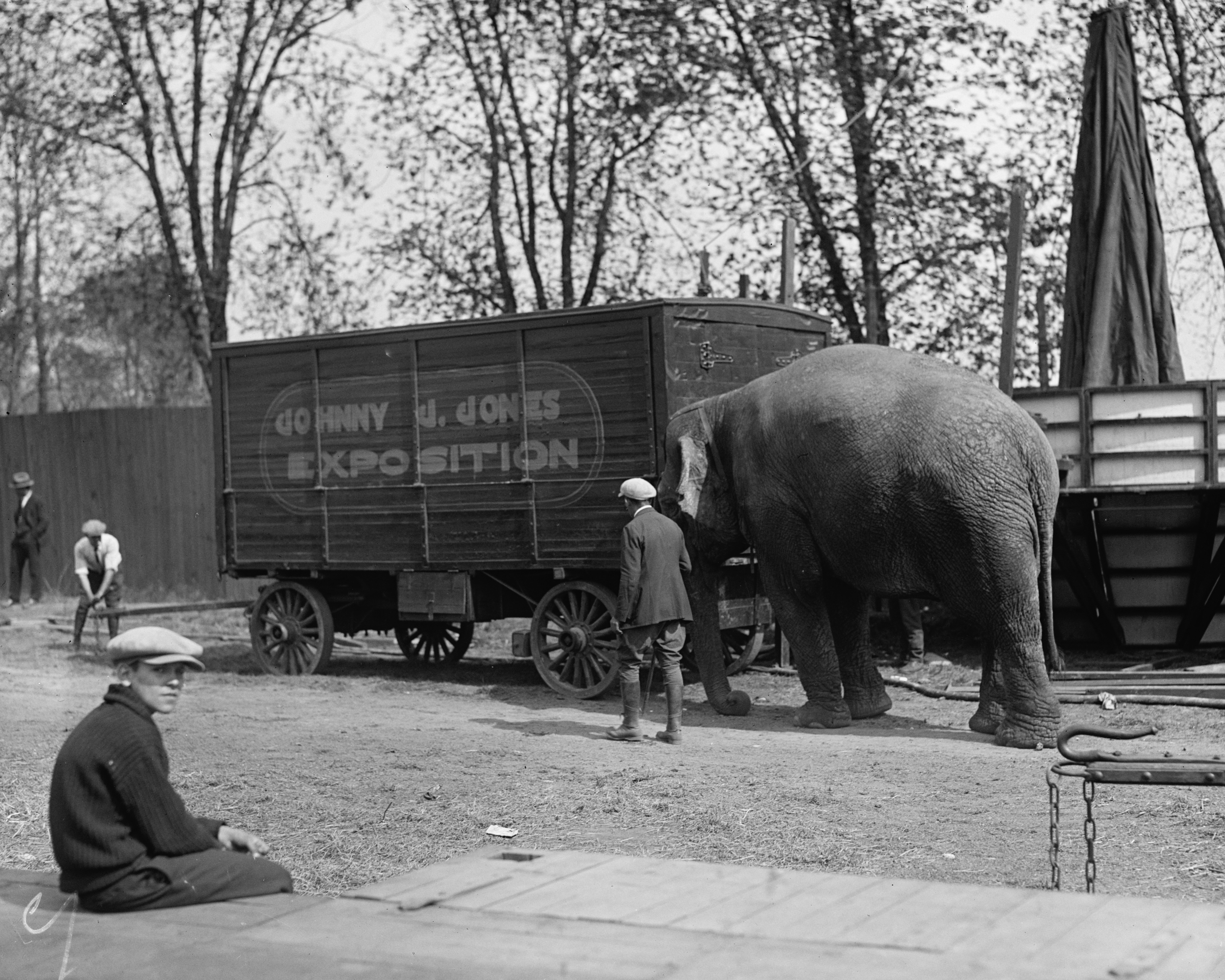
"Nellie" captive elephant from Johnny J. Jones Exposition Show on 22 April 1925

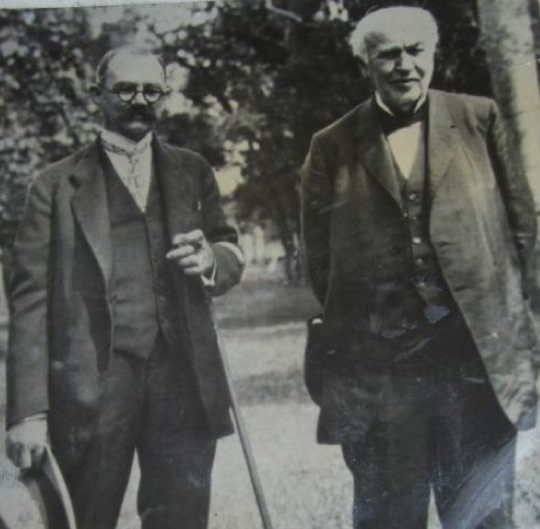
Johnny J. Jones and Thomas A. Edison in the 1920s

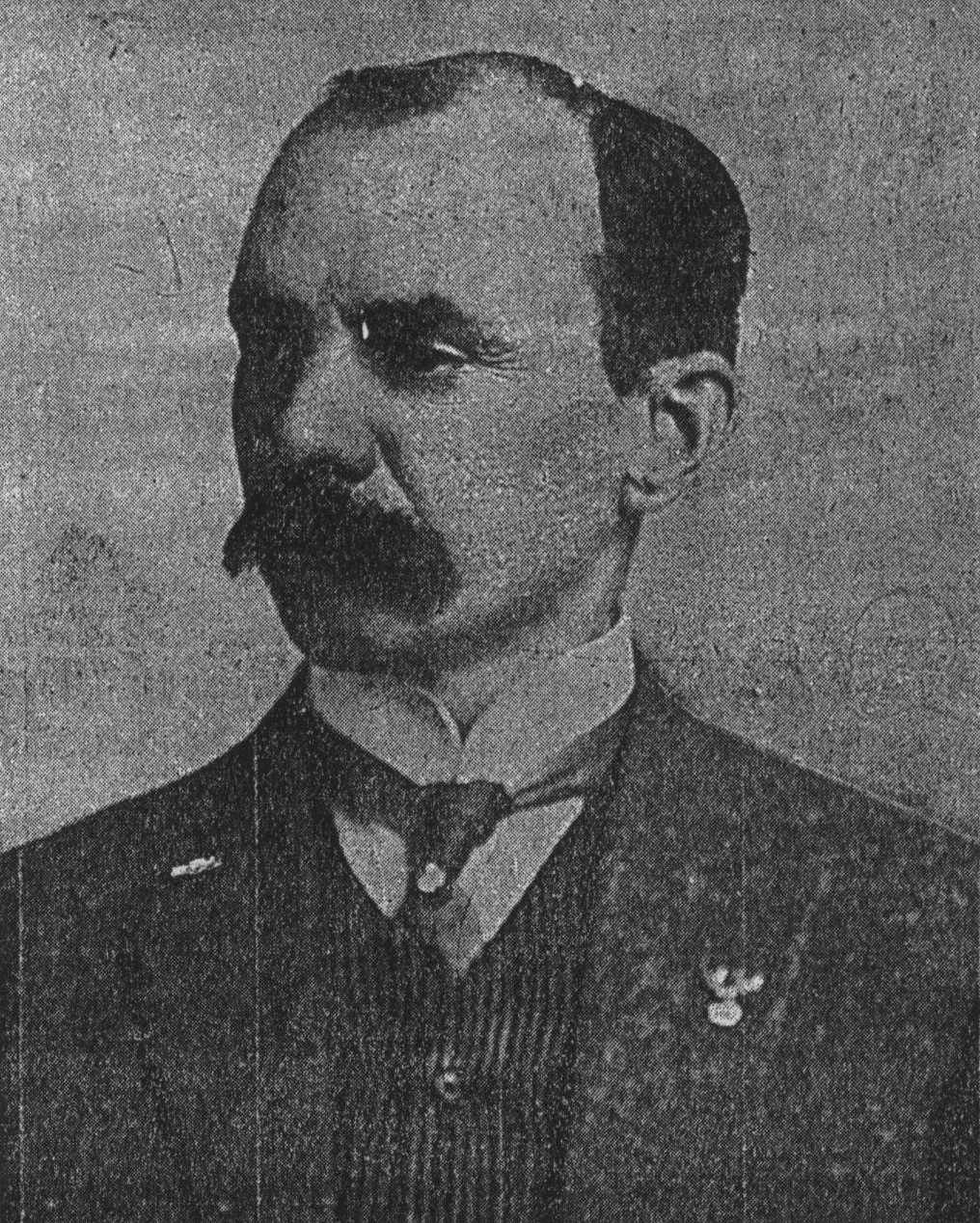
Johnny J. Jones in 1917

== Bibliography ==
- Bob Goldsack, “A History of the Johnny J. Jones Exposition: ‘The Mighty Monarch of the Tented World’”, Midway Museum Publications, Nashua, NH. (1990)
- Joe McKennon, “The Pictorial History of the American Carnival, Volume II”, Carnival Publishers of Sarasota, Florida (1972)
- Fred Dahlinger Jr., “Show Trains of the 20th Century”, Circus World Museum (2002)
