= Homage to Chagall: The Colours of Love =

1977 film

- DVD cover
- Directed by: Harry Rasky
- Written by: Harry Rasky
- Produced by: Harry Rasky
- Narrated by: Jean Gascon (French narrator); James Mason (English narrator); Joseph Wiseman (English narrator)
- Cinematography: Kenneth W. Gregg
- Edited by: Arla Saare
- Distributed by: CBC
- Release date: June 19, 1977
- Running time: 88 minutes
- Country: Canada
- Language: English

Homage to Chagall: The Colours of Love is a 1977 Canadian documentary film about artist Marc Chagall directed by Harry Rasky.

== Synopsis ==
Imaginatively utilizing more than 300 mosaics, stained-glass windows, murals and paintings, plus an in-depth interview with the famous Russian artist himself, Homage to Chagall is both a tribute to and a celebration of a life of intense productivity that encompassed everything from primitive mysticism to cubist intellectuality.

== Reception ==
Writing in the Saturday Review, Judith Crist stated in that Homage to Chagall, "the filmmaker has made magical blend of sight and sound that transcends the screen in a triumphant tribute to humanism." Crist continues that Homage to Chagall "can be seen again and again, as it should. So masterly a homage to a master is a rare and wonderful achievement."

Homage to Chagall: The Colours of Love was nominated for an Academy Award for Best Documentary Feature. The Directors Guild of America awarded Rasky with Outstanding Direction of a Documentary/Actuality in 1985.
