= Child of Our Time =

BBC documentary television series

- Genre: Longitudinal study Documentary
- Created by: Tessa Livingstone
- Starring: Professor Robert Winston (2000–2017)
- Country of origin: United Kingdom
- Original language: English
- No. of series: 11
- No. of episodes: 32

Production
- Producers: BBC; Open University
- Running time: 60 minutes

Original release
- Network: BBC One; BBC Four ("A Revolution in Childhood"); BBC Two ("Turning 20")
- Release: 23 February 2000 – 11 March 2020

Related
- Up; Born to Be Different

Child of Our Time is a documentary commissioned by the BBC, co-produced with the Open University and presented by Robert Winston. It follows the lives of 25 children, born at the beginning of the 21st century, as they grow from infancy, through childhood, and on to becoming young adults.

== Programme ==
The aim of the series is to build up a coherent and scientifically accurate picture of how the genes and the environment of growing children interact to make a fully formed adult. A large portion of the series is made up of experiments designed to examine these questions. The main topic under consideration is: "Are we born or are we made?". The nature of the family in contemporary Britain is also addressed.

The project ran for 20 years, following its subjects from birth until the age of 20. During the first half of its run a set of about three or four episodes was produced annually. After 2008 new episodes became less frequent, and in 2011 there was some doubt about the future of the programme, including from Winston himself. In February 2013 it was announced that the series would resume, with two new episodes presented by Winston. Further episodes followed in 2017, with a final instalment in 2020 concluding the series. Rather than the psychological experiments of previous series, episodes from 2013 focused on interviews with the participants and their families. The final episode focused primarily on three participants (Eve, Jamie and Rhianna) reflecting on their childhood, with short interview contributions from others.

== The children ==
The 25 children that feature in the programme were born to 22 families between January and February 2000. They were chosen in order to represent a wide range of genetic, social, geographical and ethnic backgrounds. They are:

- Alex and Ivo: Identical twins Alex and Ivo Lloyd Young were born eleven weeks early to parents Berenice Lloyd and Alastair Young. The family lives in Glasgow. Alex and Ivo remained close and both went to Glasgow University, where Alex studied Immunology and Ivo studied Maths & Physics.
- Calvin: Born ten weeks early to parents Helen Kirkham and Andy Pearson, Calvin has an older sister, Lauren. Helen and Andy have since split up.
- Charlie: Charlie's mother Toni was sixteen when she fell pregnant with her daughter Charlie. Toni's mother and grandmother also had babies early. Toni split up with Charlie's father before Charlie was born and fell in love with electrician Rob Plaster. Rob treats Charlie like his own daughter and he and Toni have had two more children Kayla and Alex. They have separated since. Toni works as a nurse.
- Charlotte (Lottie): Charlotte Langeveld was born as a result of IVF treatment to parents Richard and Jacqui. She had a twin brother, Alexander, who was stillborn. Her parents married three months after the birth of Charlotte's sister Jasmine, but have now divorced. They try to remain amicable for the sake of their daughters. At the end of the project she was working as an office administrator in London.
- Charlotte (Charlie): Charlotte Goldsmith was born in Essex . She has one older brother and her parents Emma and Paul separated six months after her birth. After going into care at the age of 5, Charlie lived independently by the end of the experiment, by which time she had had a son of her own.
- Ethan: Before Ethan's birth his mother Kerri lost two female babies; one was miscarried and one was stillborn. She also lost Ethan's twin through miscarriage in the third month of pregnancy. Ethan loves playing computer games but struggles at school and has been diagnosed with attention deficit hyperactivity disorder (ADHD) and Asperger syndrome. Ethan had a problem with his speech which affected his ability to make friends in school, but it resolved itself soon after. Ethan and his family live in Northern Ireland and he studied Computer Science.
- Eve: Eve's parents, Tim and Caroline Scarborough, are Evangelical Christians who tried for years to conceive a baby through IVF but were unsuccessful. Eve was unplanned and conceived naturally. Her parents were delighted but Caroline had post-natal depression. Eve has a younger sister, Holly, born in 2005. It was announced at the end of the episode The Age of Stress that Caroline, Eve's mother, had died from cancer in 2008. Tim is now remarried, and Eve has two stepsisters. In the 2017 series Eve and her father describe how she came out as a lesbian aged 14. Eve became a student midwife based in Keele and enjoyed living with her new friends whilst she fulfils her dreams of working with women and babies. In the last episode Eve also discusses her mental health.
- Helena: Born at just twenty-five weeks, Helena is the sole survivor of triplets. Because of her premature birth her doctors believed she would have major respiratory and developmental problems. Helena did not crawl until eighteen months and did not speak her first word until two years. However Helena learned to walk, talk, run and join in with everything and became advanced intellectually. She became a happy, confident loving older sister to Bella. Helena's parents decided to separate after 13 years of marriage. Helena studied Drama and Performance Practice at Cheltenham Uni.
- Het: Born to parents Vijay and Tejal in a close-knit, extended family, Het speaks both English and her first language of Gujarati. In 2005 Het's mother became pregnant and had a baby in October. Het loves dancing and studied to become an astrophysicist at Imperial College in London.
- James: James' mother Carol comes from a very disadvantaged background and has a learning disability. She split up from the father of her elder child Bernie and James's father. James has asthma and was kidnapped at age five by Carol's ex-boyfriend, Ian.
- Jamie: After experiencing post-natal depression with her two eldest children, Sharon Craven was sterilised; it did not work and she became pregnant with Jamie, who was slow to learn to talk and speak. Doctors diagnosed a hearing problem so had grommets put in his ears, after which he blossomed. Jamie was diagnosed with Diabetes mellitus type 1 aged just four years old. His condition needs constant monitoring and frequent injections. At 16 years old he had a near fatal incident when he was in a diabetic coma. Jamie worked as a sous chef and was expecting a baby at the end of the experiment.
- Mabel, Alice and Phoebe: Non-identical triplets Mabel, Alice and Phoebe have three elder siblings. Their parents Nigel and Tracey Baller claim to be calm and easygoing with all the children. The triplets have developed different temperaments; Mabel is more outgoing. She is attending tertiary education, Alice is soft-spoken and Phoebe is more introvert and loves horses. Alice worked as a Dental Nurse, Mabel a Shop Supervisor and Phoebe worked at a research facility.
- Matthew (known as Matt in 2017 series): The younger brother of Robert and the second son of Kathryn and Graham Singleton, Matthew as child was sweet, slightly shy and anxious. Matt studied Sports Management at Northumbria University.
- Megan: Megan is the daughter of Rhodri, a Welsh farmer, and Gaynor Davies. She has one older brother and sister. She studied economics at University.
- Nathan: A cheery, enthusiastic boy who is being brought up by parents Ruth and Richard Price. Nathan was a big baby and is being brought up by his parents with strong values. The family spent several years living a self-sufficient, organic lifestyle in the countryside, but eventually moved to be closer to the school Nathan is in. Nathan's parent have split up but continue to live in the same place and are best friends. Nathan's father was revealed to be gay and both parents have their own relationships. Nathan has a great relationship to his father. He is an artist and studied fine arts at university.
- Parys: Parys is the son of artist Alison Lapper, a single mother. Alison is disabled, born with no arms and very short legs. While pregnant with Parys, she had casts made of her body to create a giant marble statue of her. Artist Marc Quinn created this statue, which was placed on the fourth plinth of Trafalgar Square in 2005–2007. Alison has also written an autobiography, entitled My Life in My Hands. Parys was born by caesarean section and did not sleep well as a baby. He had a lot of carers helping Alison take care of him over the years and had a strong bond with his mother. Parys was last featured in the series in 2013, and died of an accidental drug overdose in August 2019.
- Rebecca: A very small child whose parents Mark and Gill Saunders are Jewish. Rebecca has an older brother. Rebecca studied geography at the University of Nottingham.
- Rhianna: The only child of Tanya Knights and Andy Lees, Rhianna is fascinated by nature and history. It was mentioned in the 2017 series that Tanya and Andy had separated.
- Rubin: Rubin was born at thirty seven weeks and rushed to intensive care. He had to be hospitalised again at two months old as he contracted pneumonia. Rubin is the third of four boys; mother Debbie Bayfield was single for a while but married the father of her fourth son. In 2008, he gained a place at the Choral school in Westminster.
- Taliesin: Taliesin is the second child and first son of Olivia and Robin Stevenson who split up before his birth but got back together again. Olivia became a teenage mother with Taliesin's sister, Emily, and left education behind at an early age after being bullied. Taliesin studied Politics and International Relations at Essex.
- Tyrese: Tyrese is the third child and first son of Marie and Jamal Haqib in inner-city Birmingham. Marie, who is dyslexic, had strong designs for Tyrese's future, considering he was a black male in the UK. His parents got divorced when he was three. Aged 20, Tyrese was charged with, and later jailed for, offences related to drug dealing.
- William (known as Will in 2017 series): Keen on sport and outperforming, as well as harassing his older brother, William was born by caesarean and lives in a small town in Yorkshire. He studied at a university in the US on a Tennis scholarship.

== Episode guide ==
No.	Entitle	Air Date
Series One (2000)
1	Babies	23 February
Series Two (2001)
2	The Personality Test	27 June
3	Tomboy or Sissy?	4 July
4	Brain Magic	11 July
Series Three (2002)
5	Thanks for the Memories	13 August
6	Power Struggles	20 August
7	Active or Idle	28 August
Series Four (2004)
8	Zero to Hero	6 January
9	Read My Lips	13 January
10	The Making of Me	10 January
Series Five (2005)
11	Identity Crisis	4 January
12	State of Play	11 January
13	What are Dads for?	18 January
14	Tried and Tested	25 January
Series Six (2006)
15	Happiness	15 January
16	Flesh and Blood	22 January
17	Right and Wrong	29 January
18	Your Recipe for Success	5 February
Series Seven (2007)
19	The Will to Win	19 August
20	Fitting in or Standing Out	26 August
21	Killing Creativity	2 September
Series Eight (2008)
22	The Divide of the Sexes	7 May
23	The Age of Stress	14 May
24	24 Hours	21 May
Series Nine (2010)
26	The Big Personality Test	30 May
27	The Big Personality Test	31 May
Series Ten (2013)
28	Growing Up	27 February
29	Changing Families	28 February
Series Eleven (2017)
30	Changing Minds	3 April
31	Changing Times	4 April
Special (2020)
32	Turning 20	11 March

== Child of Our Time - the Children's Stories ==
In 2006, there was a spin-off series showing a 30-minute programme each week on one child and their story so far from birth to the age of 6.

Series	Start date	End date	Episodes
1	8 February 2006	22 March 2006	5
2	4 October 2006	1 November 2006	5

== See also ==
- Up series, a similar series of documentary films that have followed the lives of fourteen British children since 1964.
- Born to Be Different, a similar series focusing on children with a disability.
