= Charles Furneaux (TV producer) =

British television producer and documentary maker (born 1956 or 1957)

- Born: 1956 or 1957 (age 68–69)
- Education: Durham University
- Occupations: Director; producer; editor
- Years active: 1984–2017

Charles St John Wallace Furneaux (born 1956 or 1957) is a retired British television producer and documentary filmmaker.

== Early life and education ==
Charles St John Wallace Furneaux was born in 1956 or 1957.

He attended a preparatory school in Kensington and later attended Marlborough College and Durham University, where he read modern history, graduating with a 2:1 degree in 1978.

== Up series ==
Furneaux is a former participant in the Up series, a documentary series which followed the lives of 14 British citizens in seven-year intervals, beginning when they were seven years old in 1964. Furneaux was interviewed for the first three adaptations, Seven Up!, 7 Plus Seven, and 21 Up, in 1964, 1970, and 1977, and in all three was interviewed alongside John Brisby and Andrew Brackfield, with whom he had attended prep school.

Furneaux declined to participate in the series after the 21 Up episode, broadcast in 1977. After Charles declined to appear in 28 Up, during a subsequent phone conversation, director Michael Apted, by his own admission, "went berserk", which destroyed the relationship to the degree that Furneaux has refused to participate in all subsequent films. Allison Pearson, writing for The Telegraph, reports that Apted alleged Furneaux had filed a lawsuit aimed at "remov[ing] Charles' likeness from the archive sequences in 49 Up"; however, in all of the instalments of the Up series that do not feature Furneaux, he still appeared in archive footage, and up until 49 Up, was still mentioned. In 56 and 63 Up, Charles is never mentioned, aside from older footage.

In 2026, it was announced that for 70 Up, the tenth and final instalment, Charles was to contribute to the documentary, the first time since 1977, but only as a voice-over, with a recent photo of himself he provided. In 2026, Furneaux went into more detail as to why he left the series, saying: "We had no idea really of what was going on, when I gave my mother a hard time about this subsequently, she said the headmaster had wanted to promote the school. We'd never given consent. Our parents didn't really know what was going on. And I was stuck with two boys who, while they were perfectly nice, weren't mates of mine."

== Career ==
Furneaux attended Durham University, and completed his BBC trainee scheme. He began his career as an assistant producer with the BBC, becoming a commissioning editor at Channel 4 in 1994. In 2003, Furneaux went to Talkback Thames as Head of Specialist Factual and Documentaries, resigning in 2007 to manage his own production company, Kaboom Film & TV. Furneaux has participated in one of the original television series in which a viewer was encouraged to voice their opinions regarding current television programmes, Right to Reply, in 1998.

Furneaux moved into journalism, working as a newspaper editor for the BBC.

Furneaux produced Diana: In Her Own Words, which broadcast on 6 August 2017 and became Channel 4's "most-watched documentary since 2014", peaking with 4.1 million viewers. Furneaux retired around 2017.

== Awards ==
Award-winning productions of Furneaux include:

- The Natural History of the Chicken, which won an Emmy Award in the category of Outstanding Science and Nature Programming-Long Form in 2002.
- Touching the Void won BAFTA's 2004 Alexander Korda award for the outstanding British film of the year.
- The Shooting of Thomas Hurndall, in 2009, won two BAFTA Awards and one Monte Carlo Golden Nymph Award
- Treblinka: Inside Hitler's Secret Death Camp won a Cine Golden Eagle Award in the History category of the Televised Documentary & Performance Division in 2014.

== Filmography ==
=== Television ===
| Year | Title | Role | Notes and source |
|---|---|---|---|
| 1964 | 7 Up | Himself | First instalment of the Up series; originally aired as an episode of World in Action |
| 1970 | 7 Plus Seven | Himself | Second instalment of the Up series |
| 1977 | 21 Up | Himself | Third instalment of the Up series |
| 1984 | 28 Up | Himself | Fourth instalment of the Up series; Furneaux only appears in archive footage from 7 Up, 7 Plus Seven, and 21 Up |
| 1984 | All Our Working Lives | Producer | One episode |
| 1984–1985 | Out of Court | Director/producer | Two episodes; director (one episode, 1984), producer (one episode, 1985) |
| 1986–1987 | Food & Drink | Director | Six episodes |
| 1988–1992 | Panorama | Producer | Fifteen episodes |
| 1990–2003 | Frontline | Producer | Two episodes |
| 1991 | 35 Up | Himself | Fifth instalment of the Up series; Furneaux only appears in archive footage from 7 Up, 7 Plus Seven, and 21 Up |
| 1995 | Secret Lives | Director/producer | One episode / credited as "Charles Furneau" |
| 1996 | People's Century | Director/producer | Two episodes |
| 1997–2002 | To the Ends of the Earth | Commissioning editor | Six episodes |
| 1997–1998 | Cutting Edge | Commissioning editor | Three episodes |
| 1998 | 42 Up | Himself | Sixth instalment of the Up series; Furneaux only appears in archive footage from 7 Up, 7 Plus Seven, and 21 Up |
| 1998 | Mysterious Mummies of China | Executive producer | Television movie |
| 1998 | Right to Reply | Himself | One episode |
| 1998 | Danger UXO | Strand editor | Television movie |
| 2000 | Secrets of the Stone Age | Commissioning editor | Three episodes |
| 2000 | The Day the World Took Off | Commissioning editor | Three episodes |
| 2000–2001 | Equinox | Commissioning editor | Two episodes / uncredited |
| 2001 | Planet Storm | Producer | Television movie |
| 2001 | Climbing the Fatherland | Commissioning editor | Television movie / uncredited |
| 2001 | Going to Extremes | Executive producer | Television movie |
| 2001–2004 | Secrets of the Dead | Commissioning editor/producer | Three episodes / editor (one episode in 2001 and 2004) producer (one episode in 2002) |
| 2002 | Yamashita's Gold | Commissioning editor | Television movie |
| 2002 | Dinosaur Detectives | Commissioning editor | Television movie |
| 2002–2003 | The Big Trip | Commissioning editor | |
| 2003 | Gods in the Sky | Commissioning editor | |
| 2003 | The Big Monster Dig | Commissioning editor | |
| 2003 | Barbarians, Secrets of the Dark Age | Commissioning editor | Three episodes |
| 2005 | 49 Up | Himself | Seventh instalment of the Up series; Furneaux only appears in archive footage from 7 Up, 7 Plus Seven, and 21 Up |
| 2005 | Poisoned | Executive producer | Television movie |
| 2005 | The Untouchables | Executive producer | Four episodes |
| 2006 | The Teen Tamer | Executive producer | Six episodes |
| 2006 | The Last Aztec | Executive producer | Television documentary |
| 2006–2008 | Buildings That Shaped Britain | Executive producer | Six episodes |
| 2007 | The Yellow House | Executive producer | Television documentary |
| 2007 | The Building of the Year: The Riba Stirling Prize 2007 Live | | |
| 2008 | The Shooting of Thomas Hurndall | Executive producer | Television documentary |
| 2009 | Morphed | Executive producer | Three episodes |
| 2009 | Brothers in Arms-Basra | Executive producer | |
| 2011 | Dispatches | Executive producer | One episode |
| 2012 | 56 Up | Himself | Eighth instalment of the Up series; Furneaux only appears in archive footage from 7 Up, 7 Plus Seven, and 21 Up |
| 2012 | Revealed | Executive producer | One episode |
| 2012 | Nazi Temple of Doom | | |
| 2013 | Treblinka: Inside Hitler's Secret Death Camp | Executive producer | Television documentary, directed by Alex Nikolic-Dunlop. |
| 2013 | Bill's Kitchen: Notting Hill | Executive producer | |
| 2014 | The French Revolution: Tearing Up History | Executive producer | Television documentary |
| 2015 | A Brief History of Graffiti | Executive producer | Television documentary |
| 2017 | Diana: In Her Own Words | Producer | |
| 2019 | 63 Up | Himself | Ninth instalment of the Up series; Furneaux only appears in archive footage from 7 Up, 7 Plus Seven, and 21 Up |
| 2026 | 70 Up | Himself | Tenth instalment of the Up series; Furneaux only appears visually in archive footage from 7 Up, 7 Plus Seven, and 21 Up but does give an off-camera interview |

=== Film ===
| Year | Title | Role |
|---|---|---|
| 1984 | Protest and the Suburban Guerrilla | Director |
| 1995 | Jackie O | Director |
| 2000 | The Natural History of the Chicken | Executive producer |
| 2003 | Touching the Void | Executive producer |

== Further reading and viewing ==
- List of production credits for Furneaux from the BFI
