= Up (film series) =

British documentary film series (1964–2026)

- 2019 DVD collection cover
- Genre: Longitudinal study Documentary
- Directed by: Paul Almond (Seven Up!); Michael Apted (1970–2019); Asif Kapadia (70 Up)
- Starring: Bruce Balden; Jackie Bassett; Symon Basterfield; Andrew Brackfield; John Brisby; Peter Davies; Susan Davis; Charles Furneaux; Nick Hitchon (died 2023); Neil Hughes; Lynn Johnson (died 2013); Paul Kligerman; Suzanne (Suzy) Lusk; Tony Walker
- Narrated by: Douglas Keay (Seven Up!); Michael Apted (1970–2019)
- Theme music composer: Trevor Duncan
- Opening theme: "Syncho-Jazz"
- Ending theme: "Syncho-Jazz"
- Country of origin: United Kingdom
- Original language: English
- No. of episodes: 10 (in 18 parts)

Production
- Producer: Claire Lewis
- Production locations: United Kingdom; Bulgaria; Bangladesh; France; Australia; United States; Spain; Portugal
- Cinematography: George Jesse Turner
- Editor: Kim Horton
- Running time: 40–150 mins. per film 1,018 mins. total

Original release
- Network: ITV (Granada Television) (1964–1991, 2005–2026); BBC One (1998)
- Release: 5 May 1964 – 22 September 2026

Related
- Child of Our Time; Born to Be Different

The Up series of documentary films follows the lives of ten boys and four girls in the United Kingdom, beginning in 1964, when they were seven years old. The documentary series has had ten episodes—one every seven years—spanning 63 years to the final instalment in 2026. The first film was titled Seven Up!, the second 7 Plus Seven; the third 21 Up; and the rest similarly titled through to 70 Up, matching the subjects' age at the time of filming. The director of the first film was Paul Almond, with the next eight directed by Michael Apted and the last (after Apted's death) by Asif Kapadia. The series was produced by Granada Television for ITV, which has broadcast all of them except 42 Up (1998), which was broadcast on BBC One. Individual films and the series as a whole have received numerous accolades.

== History ==
The first film in the series, Seven Up! (1964), was directed by Canadian Paul Almond, and was commissioned by Granada Television as a programme in the World in Action series. 7 Plus Seven until 63 Up were directed by Michael Apted, who had been a researcher on Seven Up! and was involved in finding the original children, with Gordon McDougall. The film's premise is from the Jesuit motto "Give me a child until he is seven and I will give you the man". The 1998 edition, 42 Up, was broadcast on BBC One but still produced by Granada Television.

The children were selected for the original programme to represent the range of socioeconomic backgrounds in Britain at that time, on the assumption that the children's social class would determine their futures. The first instalment was made as a one-off edition of Granada Television's series World in Action, directed by Almond, with involvement by "a fresh-faced young researcher, a middle-class Cambridge graduate", Apted, whose role in the initial programme included "trawling the nation's schools for 14 suitable subjects". Of the first programme, Apted said:

It was Paul's film ... but he was more interested in making a beautiful film about being seven, whereas I wanted to make a nasty piece of work about these kids who have it all, and these other kids who have nothing.

After Almond directed the original programme, Apted continued the series with new instalments every seven years, filming material from those of the 14 who chose to participate. The aim of the continuing series is stated at the beginning of Seven Up: "We brought these children together because we wanted a glimpse of England in the year 2000. The shop steward and the executive of the year 2000 are now seven years old". The ninth instalment, 63 Up, premiered in the UK on ITV in 2019.

A special episode featuring celebrity fans of the series, 7 Up & Me, also aired on ITV in 2019. Apted is reported to have said, "I hope to do 84 Up when I'll be 99"; however, he died in 2021.

The series concluded with 70 Up, a film in two parts broadcast in September 2026. It is directed by Asif Kapadia, with all surviving participants contributing to the final film, as well as a recorded interview with participant Nick Hitchon, who died in 2023.

Two companion documentary specials were also released in 2026, with 70 Up: The Victorians using rediscovered and remastered footage of interviews of older people around the time 7 Up was first broadcast, and 7 Up: The Story exploring the making of the series. These specials aired on 22 and 23 September 2026 respectively.

== List of films and premiere dates ==
No.	Title	Director	Episodes	Originally released			Length (minutes)
No.	Title	Director	Episodes	First released	Last released	Network	Length (minutes)
1	Seven Up!	Paul Almond	1	5 May 1964		ITV (Granada Television)	40
2	7 Plus Seven	Michael Apted	1	15 December 1970		ITV (Granada Television)	53
3	21 Up	Michael Apted	1	9 May 1977		ITV (Granada Television)	100
4	28 Up	Michael Apted	2	20 November 1984	21 November 1984	ITV (Granada Television)	136
5	35 Up	Michael Apted	1	22 May 1991		ITV (Granada Television)	116
6	42 Up	Michael Apted	2	21 July 1998	22 July 1998	BBC One	133
7	49 Up	Michael Apted	2	15 September 2005	22 September 2005	ITV	134
8	56 Up	Michael Apted	3	14 May 2012	28 May 2012	ITV	144
9	63 Up	Michael Apted	3	4 June 2019	6 June 2019	ITV	150
10	70 Up	Asif Kapadia	2	15 September 2026	22 September 2026	ITV	180

== Participants ==
The subjects are first seen on a group visit to London Zoo in 1964, where the narrator announces "We brought these 20 children together for the very first time." The series then follows 14 of them: Bruce Balden, Jackie Bassett, Symon Basterfield, Andrew Brackfield, John Brisby, Peter Davies, Susan Davis, Charles Furneaux, Nicholas Hitchon, Neil Hughes, Lynn Johnson, Paul Kligerman, Suzanne Lusk and Tony Walker.

The participants were chosen in an attempt to represent different social classes in Britain in the 1960s. Apted says in the 42 commentary track that he was asked to find children at the extremes. Because the show was not originally intended to become a repeating series, no long-term contract was signed with the participants. According to Apted, participants in the subsequent programmes since Seven Up! have been paid for their appearance in each instalment, and equal parts of any prize the film may win. Each subject is filmed in about two days. The interview itself takes more than six hours.

Apted later said that it was a poor decision to include only four girls.

=== Andrew ===
Andrew Brackfield was one of three boys chosen from the same pre-preparatory school in the wealthy London district of Kensington, the other two being Charles and John. The three are introduced in Seven Up! singing "Waltzing Matilda" in Latin. At the age of seven, when asked which newspaper he reads, if any, Andrew said he read The Financial Times, though he later revealed he was just repeating what his father had told him when asked the same question. All three could say which prep schools, public schools and universities they planned to attend, Oxford or Cambridge in all cases. Two named the specific Oxbridge college they intended to join.

Andrew's academic career culminated in his studying at Trinity College, Cambridge. Andrew became a solicitor, married and raised a family. He is the only one of the three Kensington boys to have appeared in all the Up films. Both Andrew and his wife, Jane, are most satisfied with how their children have turned out, followed by their relationship. By 70 Up, Andrew had retired from his legal career. Looking back, he said he wished he had spent more time with his family while his children were growing up.

=== Charles ===
Charles Furneaux was one of the three boys from the same Kensington pre-preparatory school. He did not get into Oxford, saying in 21 he was glad to have avoided the "prep school–Marlborough–Oxbridge conveyor belt" by going to Durham University instead. He later attended Oxford as a postgraduate student. Charles has worked in journalism in varying capacities over the years, including as a producer for the BBC, and in the making of documentary films, including Touching the Void. When contacted to appear in 28, Charles declined; a subsequent phone conversation during which Apted, by his own admission, "went berserk", destroyed the relationship to the degree that Charles had refused to participate in all of Apted's subsequent films, and even attempted to force Granada to remove archive images of him from the films in which he did not appear.

During an onstage interview at London's National Film Theatre in 2005, Apted alleged that Charles had attempted to sue him when he refused to remove Charles from the archive sequences in 49. Apted also commented on the irony that as a documentary maker himself, Charles was the only one who refused to continue.

By the time of 63, all references to Charles had been removed, except for fleeting glimpses of joint shots with Andrew and John. While he did not appear on camera for 70 and provided photographs of himself in which his face was "deliberately obscured", he provided extensive voiceover comments about the series and his life. He said that while he liked the other two Kensington Kids from 7, they weren't "mates" in real life and he didn't appreciate being closely linked to them. He added that his main objection to the series and a huge point of conflict between him and Apted was Charles' view of the negative effect of television on perception in modern life.

=== John ===
John Brisby was one of the three boys from the same Kensington pre-preparatory school. He was vocal about politics by the age of 14, attended Oxford and became a barrister. He married Claire, the daughter of Donald Logan, a former ambassador to Bulgaria. Brisby devotes himself to charities related to Bulgaria, and hopes to reclaim family land there that had been nationalised. He is a great-great-grandson of the first Prime Minister of Bulgaria, Todor Burmov.

Brisby said in 35 that he only does the films to give more publicity to his chosen charities. In 56, he criticised Apted's decision to originally portray him as part of the "privileged upper class". He disclosed that his father died when he was 9 and his mother worked to put him through elite private schools. He attended Oxford on a scholarship. In 56, he remains a litigator who feels very blessed in almost all aspects of his life. In 63, he calls the series a "poison pill" but says he sees that it has value. In 70, he reveals that his interviews from 35 onwards had not been conducted by Apted, which had been a condition for his return to the series.

=== Suzy ===
Suzanne (Suzy) Lusk comes from a wealthy background and was first filmed at an independent London day school. Her parents divorced around the time of 7 Plus Seven. She dropped out of school at 16, deciding to travel to Paris. By 21, she had a low opinion of marriage and parenthood, but this soon changed dramatically. By 28, she was married with two sons, and credited her marriage with bringing her the optimism and happiness that was not evident in the earlier films.

Her husband, Rupert Dewey, is a solicitor in Bath and they have three children. She became a bereavement counsellor. In 7 Plus Seven, she said she thought Apted's project was pointless and silly, a point she restated in 21. At 49, she believed she would not participate again, but in 56, she admitted she felt an obligation to the project regardless of how she felt about it. Suzy did not appear in 63 aside from footage from previous films.

She returned for 70 Up. Suzy said she had felt "picked on" by the series and that it had misrepresented her life. Reflecting on reaching 70, she said that the deaths of younger friends had made her feel fortunate to be in reasonably good health.

=== Jackie ===
Jackie Bassett was one of three girls, the others being Lynn and Sue, from the same primary school in a working-class neighbourhood of east London. She eventually went to a comprehensive school and married at 19. Jackie went through several different jobs, divorced, remarried and moved to Scotland, divorced again and raised her three sons as a single parent. As of 56, she had been receiving disability benefit for 14 years, due to rheumatoid arthritis. Her family remains close and lives near each other in Scotland. In 70 Up, Jackie is retired and living on the Norfolk coast. She also reflects on her objections to Apted's questions about marriage and sex, which she felt he directed at the women rather than the men.

=== Lynn ===
Lynn Johnson, after attending the same primary school as Jackie and Sue, attended a grammar school. She married at 19, had two daughters, and became a children's librarian at 21. She later became a school librarian and remained in that position until being made redundant due to budget cuts. At 56, she continued to believe her career as a librarian was of great value and it helped define her life. She was a doting grandmother with three grandchildren, and still married to her husband, Russ, whom she considered her soulmate.

In 2013, after a short illness, Lynn became the first participant to die. She had served as chair of governors of St Saviour's primary school in Poplar, London, for more than 25 years. A section of its library was renamed in her memory. In 63 Up, Russ and their daughters discuss her death and its effect on them. 70 Up also remembers Lynn; Jackie Bassett speaks about the loss of her childhood friend and fellow participant.

=== Sue ===
Susan (Sue) Davis attended the same primary school as Jackie and Lynn, and later a comprehensive school. She married at 24 and had two children before getting divorced. She had been engaged to her current boyfriend, Glenn, for 21 years as of 63. She worked as a university administrator for Queen Mary, University of London, despite not having gone to university herself, and is fond of amateur dramatics. By 63, she was looking forward to retiring in the near future. By 70 Up, Sue had retired from her university job and moved to Essex. She and Glenn had married.

=== Tony ===
Tony Walker was chosen from a primary school in the East End of London and was introduced along with his classmate Michelle, who Douglas Keay, the narrator, described as Tony's "girlfriend". At 7, Michelle described Tony as a "monkey". He wanted to be a jockey at 7 and was at a stable training as one by 14. By 21, his chance had come and gone after riding in three races before giving it up. He was proud to have competed against Lester Piggott.

He then gained "the Knowledge" and made a comfortable life for himself and his family as a London taxi driver. His later dream of becoming an actor met with modest success; he had small parts as an extra, almost always playing a cabbie, in several TV programmes since 1986, including The Bill and twice in EastEnders, most recently in 2003. His wife, Debbie, was carrying their third child in 28, and she reveals in 35 that she lost that baby but has since had another. She said that losing their third child placed tremendous stress on their relationship.

Tony admitted in 35 that being in a monogamous relationship was becoming a strain, and by 42, he had committed adultery, though he and his wife had got past it and were still together. By 42, he had moved to Essex, and by 49, owned two homes, including a holiday home in Spain. In 63, he and his wife had settled in the English countryside. In 70 Up, he said that giving up riding was his greatest regret: a mentor had warned him that he would struggle to keep his weight low enough to be a jockey.

=== Paul ===
Paul Kligerman was at a Shaftesbury Homes children's home in Twickenham at 7, his parents having divorced and he having been left with his father. Soon after Seven Up!, his father and stepmother moved the family to Australia, where he has remained in the Melbourne area ever since. By 21, he had long hair and a girlfriend to whom he is still married. After leaving school he was employed as a bricklayer and later set up his own business.

In 49, he was working for a sign-making company. In 21, 49 and 63, Paul was reunited with Symon, who had attended the same children's home. Portions of their time together are included in all three films. By 56, Paul had started work at a local retirement village with his wife Susan. He does odd jobs and maintenance of the small units and gardens. By 70 Up, Paul was a grandfather and continued to live in Australia.

=== Symon ===
Symon Basterfield, given name also spelt Simon in previous films, chosen from the same Shaftesbury Homes children's home in Twickenham as Paul, is the only mixed-race participant. He never got to know his Black father, and had left the orphanage in Twickenham to live with his White mother by the time of the 7 Plus Seven filming. Her depression is alluded to as the cause for his being in the home. As filming for 35 took place, he was going through a divorce from his first wife and mother of his five children, and he elected not to participate.

Symon returned for 42 and 49, remarried with one son and one stepdaughter. In 49, he and his wife had become foster parents. By 56, he regretted his lack of formal education, which he felt limited his income over the years. He remained happily married and looked forward to the next chapters of his life. In 63, his relationship with his children from his first marriage is mending and he has 10 grandchildren. In 70 Up, Symon says that he and his second wife have fostered more than 100 children over approximately 20 years.

=== Nick ===
William Nicholas "Nick" Hitchon was born on 22 October 1957 and raised on a small farm in Arncliffe, a tiny village in the Yorkshire Dales. He was only 6 when Seven Up! was first broadcast, and always remained a year younger than the episodes' nominal age. He was educated in a one-room school four miles' walk from his home, and later at a boarding school. He went to Oxford University, where, he mentions in 63 Up, Theresa May was a contemporary, and then moved to the United States to work as a nuclear physicist.

He married Jackie, another British immigrant, who participated in 28 but was displeased with how her comments were received by viewers, many of whom apparently concluded that the marriage was doomed. She declined to appear in 35 and 42. By 49, the couple had divorced and Nick had remarried, this time to Cryss Brunner, ten years his senior, and at that time taught in Minneapolis. Nick was a professor at the University of Wisconsin–Madison in the Electrical and Computer Engineering Department from 1982 to 2022, serving as department chair from 1999 to 2002.

He appeared as a guest on NPR's quiz show Wait Wait... Don't Tell Me aired 21 June 2014, and spoke briefly about his participation in the Up series. By 63, he had developed a cancerous mass in his throat and had lost his father, leading him to contemplate mortality. Nick retired from the university in spring 2022 and died on 23 July 2023 at the age of 65, before which he filmed a final interview for 70. It was described by ITV as "poignant and moving".

=== Peter ===
Peter Davies went to the same middle-class Liverpool suburban school as Neil, who, like Peter, wanted to be an astronaut. Peter drifted through university, and by 28 was an underpaid and seemingly uninspired school teacher. Peter dropped out of the series after 28, following a tabloid press campaign against him after he criticised the government of Margaret Thatcher in his interview. The director's commentary for 42 revealed that he later divorced, took up study of the law, became a lawyer, remarried, had children and moved back to Liverpool. He returned in 56 to promote his band, the Liverpool-based country-influenced The Good Intentions. The group was still together, although one member had died, in 63.

By 70 Up, Peter was working full-time as a writer and musician. He said that appearing in the series had helped promote both the band's records and his writing.

=== Neil ===
Neil Hughes, from a Liverpool suburb, turned out to be perhaps the most unpredictable of the group. At seven he was a happy child, funny and full of life and hope, but by 7 Plus Seven, he was nervous and stressed. By 21, he was living in a squat in London, having dropped out of Aberdeen University after one term, and was finding work as he could on building sites. During the interview, he was in an agitated state.

At 28, he was still homeless, although now in Scotland. By 35, he was living in a council house in the Shetland Islands, writing and appearing in the local pantomime. By 42, he was living in Bruce's apartment in London, and Bruce had become a source of emotional support. Neil was involved in local council politics, as a Liberal Democrat in the London Borough of Hackney, and had completed a Bachelor of Arts degree from the Open University. In 1996, he was elected to Wick ward on Hackney London Borough Council, and resigned his seat in 2000.

By 49, he was a district councillor in the Eden district of Cumbria. He was elected for Shap on Eden District in 2003. He was a candidate for Eden Lakes on Cumbria County Council in 2005 and 2009, coming second to the Conservative candidate on both occasions. In 2013, following new division boundaries, Neil was elected to Eden Lakes, and did not stand again for Shap. He was re-elected to Eden Lakes in 2017.

He stood as the Liberal Democrat candidate for Stockton North in the 2005 general election and for Carlisle in the 2010 general election, finishing third on both occasions. Neil stood for Penrith and the Border – which covers the same area he represents as a councillor – at the 2015 and 2017 general elections. In 2015, he came fourth, whilst in 2017, he came third. At the 2019 general election, Hughes contested the Labour–Conservative marginal seat of Workington in Cumbria. Finishing fourth, he increased the party's vote share, but lost his deposit.

By 63 Up, Neil had married, but he and his wife had separated. He served as a lay reader in the Anglican Church and maintained a home in France. By 70 Up, he was living alone in France. He said that he sometimes felt lonely but was as happy as he could be given his circumstances. Neil welcomed the change of director for the final film, saying that it gave him a chance to present aspects of himself he felt had been missing from earlier instalments.

=== Bruce ===
Bruce Balden, as a child, was concerned with poverty and racial discrimination and wanted to become a missionary. He was attending a private boarding school. At 7, he said his greatest desire was to see his father, a soldier in Southern Rhodesia, and he seemed brave though a little abandoned. In 21, Bruce was studying mathematics at Oxford University. After graduation, he worked in an insurance company for a short term.

He then began to teach maths at a school in the East End of London. He said that he enjoyed being a part of people's advancement. In 35, he was taking a sabbatical leave and teaching maths and English in Sylhet, Bangladesh, as well as helping teachers design courses. He returned to London and continued teaching in the East End.

Just before 42, he married a fellow teacher: Apted filmed the wedding, which was also attended by Neil. Eventually becoming worn down by teaching in the East End, Bruce got a teaching position at St Albans School, Hertfordshire, a prestigious public school.

Between 42 and 49, he had two sons. In 56, he admitted he still had a hard time expressing his innermost feelings, in particular to his wife, but was a happily devoted father and husband. Still teaching at St Albans School with his wife, he had no regrets about the development of his career. By 70 Up, Bruce had retired from teaching. He sang in a local choir and volunteered with the Royal National Lifeboat Institution.

== Participation record ==
Age (Year)		7 (1964)	14 (1970)	21 (1977)	28 (1984)	35 (1991)	42 (1998)	49 (2005)	56 (2012)	63 (2019)	70 (2026)
1	Andrew	Yes	Yes	Yes	Yes	Yes	Yes	Yes	Yes	Yes	Yes
2	Charles	Yes	Yes	Yes	No	No	No	No	No	No	Yes (Note: Audio recording and still photographs only)
3	John	Yes	Yes	Yes	No	Yes	No	Yes	Yes	Yes	Yes
4	Suzy	Yes	Yes	Yes	Yes	Yes	Yes	Yes	Yes	No	Yes
5	Jackie	Yes	Yes	Yes	Yes	Yes	Yes	Yes	Yes	Yes	Yes
6	Lynn	Yes	Yes	Yes	Yes	Yes	Yes	Yes	Yes	No (Note: Includes a tribute to Lynn, who died in May 2013)	No
7	Sue	Yes	Yes	Yes	Yes	Yes	Yes	Yes	Yes	Yes	Yes
8	Tony	Yes	Yes	Yes	Yes	Yes	Yes	Yes	Yes	Yes	Yes
9	Paul	Yes	Yes	Yes	Yes	Yes	Yes	Yes	Yes	Yes	Yes
10	Symon	Yes	Yes	Yes	Yes	No	Yes	Yes	Yes	Yes	Yes
11	Nick	Yes	Yes	Yes	Yes	Yes	Yes	Yes	Yes	Yes (Note: Interview footage only)	Yes (Note: Nick died in July 2023, but shortly before his death recorded a final interview to be used in 70)
12	Peter	Yes	Yes	Yes	Yes	No	No	No	Yes	Yes	Yes
13	Neil	Yes	Yes	Yes	Yes	Yes	Yes	Yes	Yes	Yes	Yes
14	Bruce	Yes	Yes	Yes	Yes	Yes	Yes	Yes	Yes	Yes	Yes

== Future ==
The producers have called 70 Up the final instalment of the series. When Apted died in 2021, the series was thought to have ended. Producer Claire Lewis was contacted by participant Nick Hitchon, who was terminally ill and asked to record a final interview. After that interview, the team decided to make a final film. Lewis has expressed interest in making separate films about individual participants using the series' archive, for which she seeks funding.

== Motifs ==
Several themes have appeared repeatedly over the course of the series. Questions about religion, family, class, happiness and psychological state dominate many of the interviews, and inquiries about the worries and concerns subjects have for their future. Questions often take a personal tone, with Apted noting that viewers often respond to his questioning of Neil's sanity or his perception of Tony's success in life as too personal, but that he has been able to do this because of the friendship he has developed with the subjects.

== Critical response and accolades ==
The series has received high praise over the years. Roger Ebert called it "an inspired, even noble, use of the film medium", saying the films "penetrate to the central mystery of life" and that the series is among his top ten films of all time.

The Up series has been criticised by both ethnographers and the subjects themselves for its editing style. Mitchell Duneier pointed out that Apted asserted causal relationships between a character's past and present that might not exist. Apted acknowledged this, pointing out that in 21 Up he believed Tony would soon be in prison, so he filmed him around dangerous areas for use in later films. Apted also portrayed the troubled marriage of Nick earlier in the film, although his time frame for anticipating their divorce was premature. Apted said in interviews that his "tendency to play God" with the interviews was "foolishness and wrong". In 21 Up, the female participants were offended that all the questions concerned domestic affairs, marriage and children, rather than politics.

In The New Yorker, Rebecca Mead wrote, "[Apted] can be unbearably patronizing toward his subjects, particularly the working-class women, while he sets his more affluent participants up to look ludicrous". But, she added: "To his credit, Apted has shown participants arguing back against the show's premise and against his own prejudices. One of the most exhilarating moments in the series occurs in 49 Up, when Jackie [...] rounds on Apted, castigating him for his decades of underestimating her. Apted's implied humility is ultimately, if belatedly, Jackie's vindication."

In 1984, 28 Up (the then-latest instalment) was included on Roger Ebert's list of the ten greatest films of all time.

Apted won an Institutional Peabody Award in 2012 for his work on the Up series. In a list of the 100 Greatest British Television Programmes drawn up by the British Film Institute in 2000, voted for by industry professionals, 28 Up placed 26th. In 2024, Up was voted number 1 in a list of the most influential shows from the previous 50 years compiled by the Broadcasting Press Guild.

== Influence ==
=== On participants ===
Over the course of the project the programme has in varying degrees had a direct effect on the lives of its participants. The series participants often speak of the series having become sufficiently popular that they were recognised in public. For instance, in 56 Up, Tony related an anecdote about giving a ride to Buzz Aldrin, and being surprised when a passerby asks him, not Aldrin, for an autograph.

The participants' opinions regarding being involved in the series are often mentioned, and have varied greatly among the participants. John refers to the programme as a poison pill that he is subjected to every seven years, while Paul's wife credits the series for keeping their marriage together. Apted commented that one of the big surprises between filming 42 Up and 49 Up was the impact of reality television—meaning that the subjects wanted to talk about their contribution to the series in the light of this genre.

There have also been instances of the interactions of participants being engineered by the programme's producers. Paul and Nick were flown back to England at Granada's expense for the filming of 35 Up and 42 Up respectively. Paul was flown back again for 49 Up and visited Symon. Symon and his wife were flown to Australia to visit Paul in 63 Up.

Bruce was affected by Neil's plight and offered him temporary shelter in his home shortly before 42 Up, allowing Neil time to get settled in London. Despite Neil's eccentricities during his two-month stay, they clearly remained friends, with Neil later giving a reading at Bruce's wedding. In 56 Up, Suzy and Nick are interviewed together, having become friends owing to their shared rural upbringing.

=== Cultural and broader influences ===
The original hypothesis of Seven Up! was that class structure is so strong in the UK that a person's life path would be set at birth. The producer of the original programme had at one point thought to line the children up on the street, have three of them step forward and narrate "of these twenty children, only three will be successful", an idea which was not used. The idea of class immobility held up in most, but not all, cases as the series has progressed. The children from the working classes have by and large remained in those circles, though Tony seems to have become more middle class. Apted said that one of his regrets was that they did not take feminism into account, and consequently had fewer girls in their study and did not select them on the basis of any possible careers they might choose.

Although it began as a political documentary, the series has become a film of human nature and existentialism. In the director's commentary for 42 Up, Apted comments that he did not realise the series had changed tone from political to personal until 21 Up, when he showed the film to American friends who encouraged him to submit it successfully to American film festivals. Apted said that this realisation was a relief to him and allowed the films to breathe a little more.

The series has also been satirised. A 2007 episode of The Simpsons, "Springfield Up", is narrated by an Apted-like filmmaker who depicts the past and current lives of a group of Springfield residents he has revisited every eight years. The "37 Up" segment of Tracey Ullman: A Class Act, first aired in 1992, parodies the series. Harry Enfield parodied the series in a spoof titled "2 Up" with his characters Tim Nice-but-Dim and Wayne Slob. The Australian comedy TV series The Late Show satirised the series with a version in which participants were interviewed every seven minutes.

== Similar documentaries ==
- Multinational
  - I Am Eleven (2012) by Geneviève Bailey, features participants from Africa, Asia, Australia, Europe, and North America.
- Australia
  - Gillian Armstrong made a series following three girls/women from 1975 to 2009:
    - Smokes and Lollies (1975)
    - 14's Good, 18's Better (1980)
    - Bingo, Bridesmaids & Braces (1988)
    - Not Fourteen Again (1996)
    - Love, Lust & Lies (2009)
- Belgium
  - Jambers, 1980–1990. Two-part documentary by TV journalist Paul Jambers on Flemish public TV channel about secondary school students in Kapellen, near Antwerp.
- Canada
  - Avoir 16 ans (Being 16 years old) (1992) and Avoir 32 ans (Being 32 years old) (2010), directed by Robbie Hart and Luc Côté of National Film Board of Canada.
  - Du premier au dernier baiser (From the first to the last kiss) (2-part programme, 2003), by reporter Hélène Courchesne and director Nicole Tremblay of Société Radio-Canada.
  - Talk 16 (1991) and Talk 19 (1993), directed and written by Janis Lundman and Adrienne Mitchell of Back Alley Film Productions.
- Czech Republic – by Helena Třeštíková.
  - René, a single-episode portrait of a man over 20 years, starting in the late 1980s. René at IMDb
- Denmark
  - Årgang 0 (Generation 0) by TV2 (2000) – The show follows the children, born in the year 2000, from birth.
- France
  - Que deviendront-ils ? (What Will They Become) from Michel Fresnel (1984–1996)
- Germany
  - Die Kinder von Golzow (The Children of Golzow) by Winfried Junge, set in former East Germany, as well as in unified Germany after 1990 (1961–2006)
  - Berlin – Ecke Bundesplatz (Berlin – On the Corner of Federation Square) (1985) by Detlef Gumm and Hans-Georg Ullrich. The documentary follows individuals, families or groups of related people in separate episodes of around one hour in length each. The sequel was broadcast in four seasons on 3sat.
    - 1999: Der Prominenten-Anwalt (The Society Lawyer), Bäckermeister im Kiez (Neighborhood Baker), Wilmersdorfer Witwen (Widows in Wilmersdorf), Die nächste Generation (The Next Generation), Die Alleinerziehende (The Single Mother), Der Aussteiger (The Dropout)
    - 2001: Grenzgänger (Tightrope-walkers), Solisten (Nonconformists)
    - 2004: Kinder! Kinder! (Children! Children!), Alte Freunde (Old Friends), Vereinigungen (Associations), Recht und Ordnung (Law and Order)
    - 2009: Mütter und Töchter (Mothers and Daughters), Die Aussteiger (The Off-beats), Schön ist die Jugend... (Youth is Beautiful...), Die Köpcke-Bande (The Köpcke Gang), Der Yilmaz-Clan (The Yilmaz Clan)
- Hungary
  - "A Ballagás" (1980-81) ["The Graduation": a ceremony when students are leaving their school] by Tamás Almási. The fourth class C, about to graduate, organises a special party after the prom, during which they go back to their school; but, as their emotions are unleashed, an unbridled frenzy begins, during which their classroom also catches fire. The teachers hold the students responsible for what happened, but the students feel violated in their humanity and begin to rebel. They break the rules: they leave the school building without permission during class. The young people strive to change the world, but the impact of graduation transforms them into young people with individual ideas and a vision for the future.
    - 1986 –"A Ballagás után öt évvel" [Five years after his film "Ballagás" or First Reunion]. Tamás Almási brought together the former young actors for a class reunion in 1986. On the border between reality and fiction, the documentary does not continue the fate of the fictional film heroes, but asks the former actor students themselves about where they actually ended up in life, how they became adults after their high school years.
    - 1994. "A találkozó" [The [Second] Reunion] film is part of a series of earlier and later fateful documentaries by Tamás Almási. The director revisited the characters of a previous project about high school students eight years later.
    - 2005 "A harmadik találkozás" [The Third Reunion] The actors of the story can be seen in the film. On the occasion, the 40-year-old characters confront their youthful selves and each other's life paths.
- Italy
  - Intervista a mia madre (Interview to my mother) (2000) and Le cose belle (The beautiful things) (2014) by Agostino Ferrente and Giovanni Piperno; the documentaries show two periods in the life of a group of teenagers living in Naples.
- Japan
  - Kimiko Fukuda made a series following thirteen children living in different parts of Japan:
    - Sekai no 7 sai Nippon (World 7 years in Japan, 7 Up Japan) (1992)
    - 14 sai ni narimashita Kodomotachi 7nen gotono seicho kiroku (I turned 14 Growth records every 7 years, 14 Up Japan)(1999)
    - 7nen goto no seicho kiroku 21sai Kazoku soshite watashi (Growth records every 7 years 21 Family and me, 21 Up Japan) (2006)
    - 7nen goto no seicho kiroku 28sai ni narimashista (Growth records every 7 years I turned 28, 28 Up Japan) (2013)
    - 7nen goto no seicho kiroku 35sai ni narimashista (Growth records every 7 years I turned 35, 35 Up Japan) (2020)
  - Joe, Tomorrow (2015), by Junji Sakamoto, follows the life of boxer Joichiro Tatsuyoshi.
- Latvia
  - Ivars Seleckis film series following the lives of five different children.
    - To Be Continued (2018)
    - To be continued. Teenhood. (2024)
- The Netherlands
  - Bijna volwassen (Almost Grown-up) (1982) – follows a group of 17–18-year-olds.
  - Bijna 30 (Almost 30) (1994)
  - Bijna 40 (Almost 40) (2005)
- South Africa – by Angus Gibson
  - 7 Up in South Africa (1992)
  - 14 Up in South Africa (1999)
  - 21 Up South Africa (2006)
  - 28 Up South Africa (2013)
- Spain
  - Generació D by TV3 (1989–2019, ongoing). About a group of children from Catalonia.
- Sweden
  - Jordbrosviten by Rainer Hartleb; about a group of children from Jordbro, a suburb of Stockholm.
    - Från en barndomsvärld (From a Childhood World) (1973)
    - Barnen från Jordbro (Children from Jordbro) (1982)
    - Tillbaka till Jordbro (Jordbro Revisited) (1988)
    - Det var en gång... en liten flicka (Once Upon a Time... there was a Little Girl) (1992)
    - En pizza i Jordbro (A Pizza in Jordbro) (1994)
    - Nya barn i Jordbro (New Children in Jordbro) (2001)
    - Alla mår bra (All are doing Well) (2006)
  - Student 92 by Gunilla Nilars. About a group of high school graduates of '92, class of E3b from Gångsätra gymnasium in Lidingö, interviewed every five years for a total of twenty years.
    - Student 92...men sen då? (High school graduate of '92...and then what?) (1997)
    - Student 92, tio år senare (High school graduate of '92, ten years later) (2002)
    - Student 92, femton år senare (High school graduate of '92, fifteen years later) (2007)
    - Student 92, tjugo år senare (High school graduate of '92, twenty years later) (2012)
- USSR/Russia/Former Soviet republics – by Sergei Miroshnichenko and Jemma Jupp.
  - Age 7 in the USSR (1991)
  - 14 Up Born in the USSR (1998) (this won an International Emmy)
  - Born in the USSR: 21 Up (2005)
  - Born in the USSR: 28 Up (2012)
- United Kingdom
  - A new version of the Up series titled Up New Generation began with 7Up 2000 (2000, Julian Farino) and continued with 14 Up 2000 in 2007, 21 Up: New Generation in 2014 and 28 Up: Millennium Generation in 2021.
  - Child of Our Time (2000–2020), a BBC/The Open University documentary series following the lives of 25 children who were born around the turn of the millennium
  - Born to Be Different, a Channel 4 documentary series which follows six children who were born with a disability
- United States
  - Age 7 in America (1991) directed by Phil Joanou, produced by Michael Apted
  - 14 Up in America (1998)
  - 21 Up in America (2006) directed by Christopher Dillon Quinn
  - All's Well and Fair (2012) directed by Luci Westphal. Released as a web series in 2012. All's Well And Fair at IMDb
  - Married in America (2002), also by Michael Apted
  - Married in America 2 (2007), also by Michael Apted

== See also ==
- "Springfield Up", an 18th season episode of The Simpsons that parodies the Up series
- Boyhood, an American drama film shot over twelve years as its young actor aged from 6 to 18 years
- Anna: 6–18, a filmmaker in the USSR interviews his daughter once a year while she grows up in a changing country
- Dunedin Multidisciplinary Health and Development Study, a University of Otago research project since 1972
- British birth cohort studies, continuing, multi-disciplinary longitudinal surveys monitoring the development of babies born in the UK during specific weeks
- The Truman Show, 1998 film
