= John Brisby =

British barrister and philanthropist (born 1956)

John Brisby KC
- Born: 5 May 1956 (age 70); London, England
- Education: Christ Church
- Occupation: Barrister
- Years active: 1978–present
- Spouse: Claire Logan (m. 1985)
- Mother: Liliana Brisby
- Relatives: Todor Burmov (great-great grandfather)

John Constant Shannon Mcburney Brisby (born 8 May 1956) is a British barrister and philanthropist. Brisby was one of fourteen participants in the Up documentary film series, from 1964 to 2026.

== Early life and education ==
Brisby was born to an English father, Michael Brisby (died 1965) and Bulgarian mother, Liliana Brisby (1923–1998). He has a brother and a sister.

Brisby is the grandson of Konstantin Hadjikalchev, a well-known Bulgarian merchant, politician, and philanthropist, and is a great-great-grandson of the first Prime Minister of Bulgaria, Todor Burmov. Brisby attended a preparatory school in Kensington. He attended Westminster School from 1969 to 1973, and then went to Christ Church, Oxford, studying law, from 1974 to 1977.

== Career ==
Brisby was called to the bar in July 1978, and became a barrister. Brisby was awarded Chancery Silk of the Year at the 2015 Chambers UK Bar Awards. He became King's Counsel in 1996. Brisby has devoted much of his career to charities based in Bulgaria, and is currently the chairman for Friends of Bulgaria. Brisby currently works for 4 Stone Buildings, a company that specialises in company/commercial litigation and advice.

=== Up ===
In 1964, Brisby was one of fourteen children selected to take part in the documentary 7 Up. After a follow up, 7 Plus Seven, in 1970, the documentary became a series that was filmed and aired every seven years. In the earlier adaptations, Brisby was interviewed alongside Andrew Brackfield and Charles Furneaux, who he attended preparatory school with. Brisby did not appear in 28 Up (1984), as he "hadn't been very happy with the way I'd been portrayed in the first three programmes", but agreed to return for 35 Up (1991), under the condition that Apted did not interview him, something which lasted in later adaptations directed by Apted. Brisby also did not appear in 42 Up (1998).

Brisby criticised director Michael Apted for how he was portrayed in the series, and later admitted in 35 Up that the series was "a little pill of poison in my life", claiming that he only appeared on the show to give more publicity to his chosen charities, and criticised Apted for not focusing on his charitable work and Bulgarian heritage in order to work in the "pursuit of a narrative". In 70 Up (2026), the tenth and final installment of the Up series, Brisby admitted that he "never liked Michael". Apted died in 2021, and 70 Up was directed by Asif Kapadia.

== Personal life ==
Brisby married Claire Logan, daughter of Sir Donald Logan, in 1985. He lives in London and Northamptonshire.
