= Planet (sculpture) =

Work by Marc Quinn

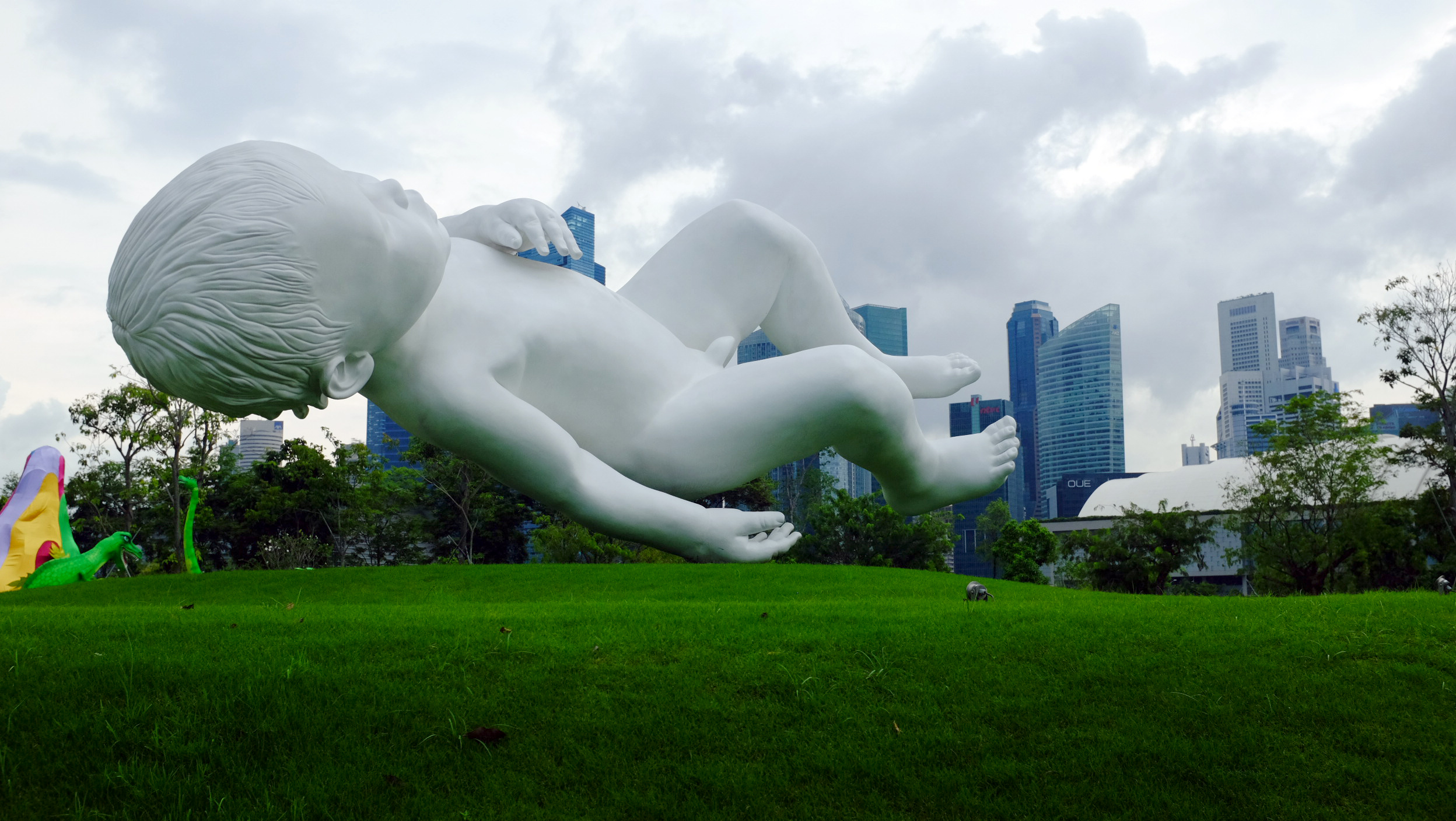
- Planet at the Gardens by the Bay in Singapore
- Artist: Marc Quinn
- Location: 1.28034°N 103.86215°E

Planet is a sculpture by Marc Quinn, installed at Gardens by the Bay in Singapore. It weighs seven tonnes and depicts a "floating" baby.

It was created in 2008 and commissioned by Chatsworth House. In 2012, It was moved to Musee Oceanographique in Monaco to be exhibited before being moved to its permanent position at Gardens by the Bay in Singapore in 2013.
