= 21 Up Japan =

- Directed by: Kimiko Fukuda
- Narrated by: Keishi Nagatsuka
- Country of origin: Japan
- Original language: Japanese

Production
- Cinematography: Toru Nakamura
- Editor: Nahoko Maruta
- Running time: 105 minutes
- Production companies: Granada International; NHK

Original release
- Network: NHK
- Release: October 22, 2006

21 Up Japan (Japanese: 7年ごとの成長記録 21歳になりました) is a 2006 television documentary film produced by Granada International and NHK. As an extension of the Up series, it follows thirteen children living in different parts of Japan by visiting them every seven years. In the third production of the "Up Japan" series they are asked to talk about their lives, families and future as on the previous two visits. Their circumstances are vastly different from each other. Some live in politically sensitive areas like Eri and Maki in Okinawa near a US military base, Sanae near the disputed Kuril Islands, while others like Yoshio and Mitsukatsu live with two different ancestral cultures. Some still live with their parents, while others live independent of their family, by or not by choice.

== See also ==
- Up (film series)
