= Alison Lapper =

English artist (born 1965)

Alison Lapper MBE
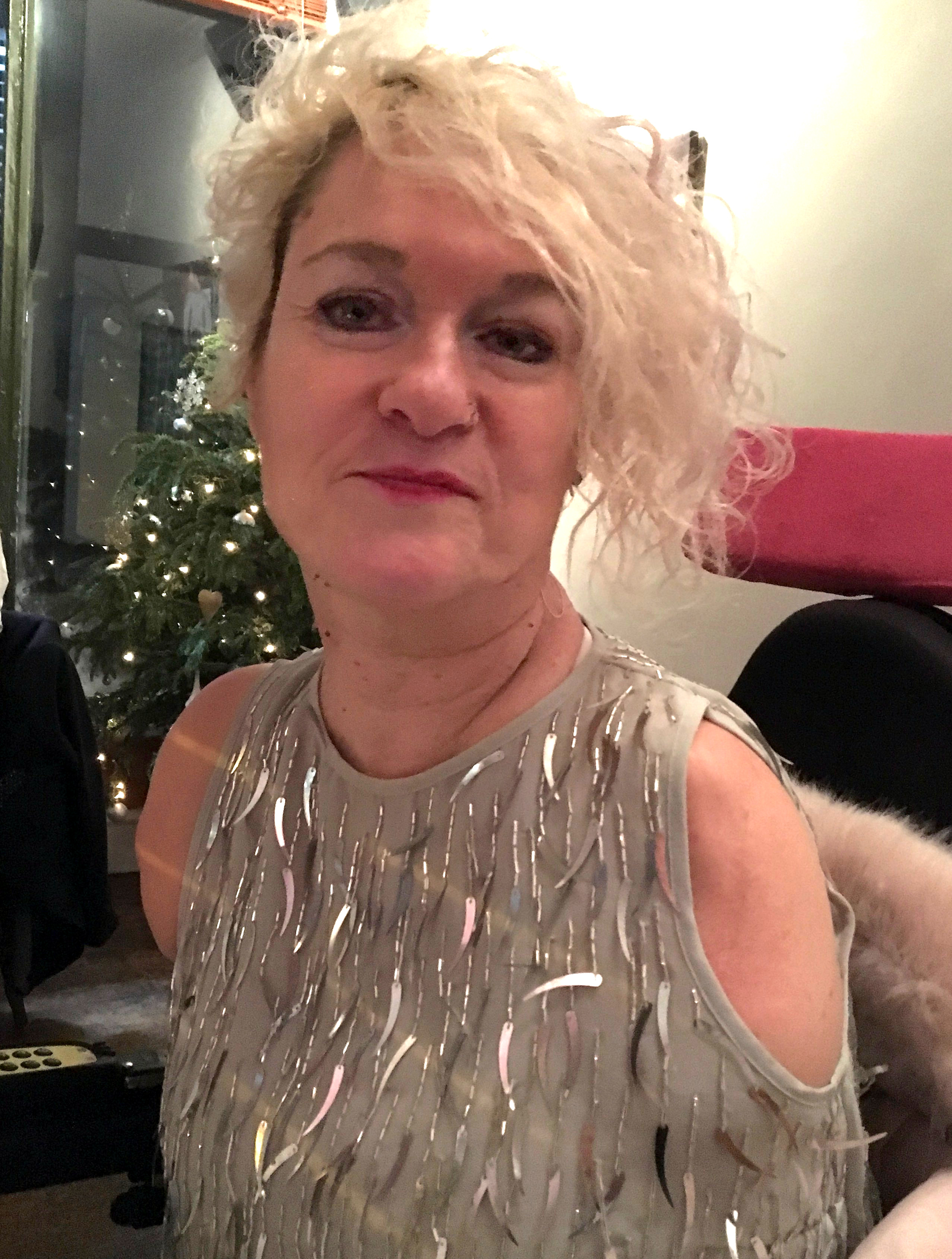
- Alison Lapper in Brighton, December 2018
- Born: 7 April 1965 (age 61); Burton upon Trent, Staffordshire
- Education: Chailey Heritage School; Queen Elizabeth's Foundation for Disabled People
- Alma mater: Heatherley School of Fine Art; University of Brighton School of Art
- Children: Parys Lapper

Alison Lapper MBE (born 7 April 1965) is a British artist. She is the subject of the sculpture Alison Lapper Pregnant, which was displayed on the fourth plinth in Trafalgar Square from September 2005 until late 2007. She and her late son Parys featured in the BBC docuseries Child of Our Time.

== Early life ==
Alison Lapper was born on 7 April 1965 in Burton-on-Trent, Staffordshire. She was born without arms and with shortened legs, a condition called phocomelia. She was institutionalized in her infancy, and is still distant from her relatives. When she was fitted with artificial limbs, she felt that the aim was not to help her, but to make her look less disconcerting to others. She abandoned them, finding life far easier without external aids.

She left Chailey Heritage School, Sussex, at the age of 17, and moved to London. She then attended the Queen Elizabeth's Foundation for Disabled People, in Banstead, Surrey until the age of 19, where she learned to drive. She completed both 'O' and 'A'-levels in art at Sutton College of Learning for Adults, before pre-foundation and foundation courses at Heatherley School of Fine Art.

Lapper then moved to Brighton and studied in the Faculty of Art and Architecture at the University of Brighton, graduating with a first class honours degree in Fine Art in 1994.

== Career ==
Lapper uses photography, digital imaging, and painting to, as she says, question physical normality and beauty, using herself as a subject. She is a member of the Association of Mouth and Foot Painting Artists of the World (AMFPA), having joined as a student member and receiving a full membership after her college graduation. The AMFPA required their artists to create Christmas cards to earn funding, so Lapper began her career making scenic, realistic landscape paintings. During her early college years many of her portraits depicted subjects that adhere to Western beauty standards. Over the course of her education she shifted her focus to portraying and exploring her own body as her subject instead. One particular influence is the sculpture Venus de Milo, due to the physical similarities between the idealised classical female statue and Lapper's own body. She has taken part in various British exhibitions, including in the Royal Festival Hall. In May 2003, Lapper was awarded an MBE for her services for art.

After she had given birth to her son Parys in 2000, she created an installation of photographs of herself with him. Lapper and her son featured on the BBC television documentary Child of Our Time. In 2006, she published her book My Life in My Hands.

After the death of her son, Parys, she worked in an exhibition called Lost in Parys where she painted various portraits of him. She also invited artists Marc Quinn and Rankin to contribute to the conversation.

== Marc Quinn sculpture ==
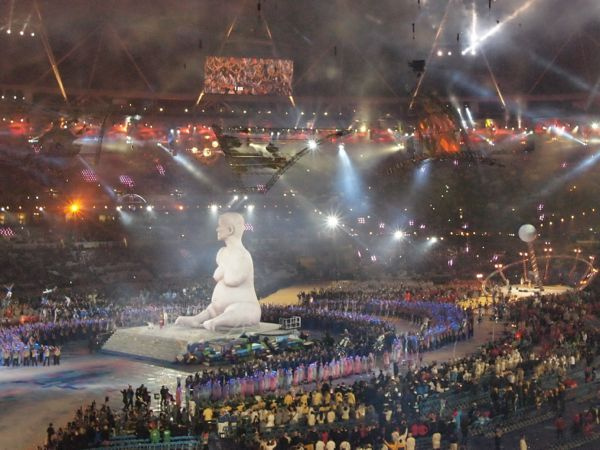
A giant replica of the sculpture in the 2012 Summer Paralympics opening ceremony

Lapper was the subject of Marc Quinn's sculpture, Alison Lapper Pregnant. Initially she refused to pose for him, unsure of the manner in which he intended to depict disability. She wanted to be sure his perspective was not one of pity.

Quinn observed that ancient statues whose limbs had fallen off were now often highly regarded. His aim was to create equally beautiful representations of bodies born naturally in that way. When he phoned again a few months later, Lapper informed him she was now seven months pregnant. His reply was, "That's even better!" In November 1999, Lapper went to Quinn's studio to have a cast made.

The sculpture is made of Carrara marble. It occupied the fourth plinth in Trafalgar Square between September 2005 and late 2007. A large replica featured in the 2012 Summer Paralympics opening ceremony.

== Honours ==
In May 2003, Lapper was awarded an MBE for services to art. In July 2014, she was awarded an honorary doctorate from the University of Brighton.

== Personal life ==
Lapper had a son, Parys, with whom she was pregnant when posing for the Marc Quinn sculpture. He died suddenly from a suspected accidental drug overdose in August 2019, aged 19. His mother afterwards said that he had been bullied at school over her disability, which led to him being sectioned for mental health problems at the age of 17.

Her grief led her to help create The Drug of Art, a charity which encourages young people to create art with the goal of combatting mental health issues for youth.

== Biography ==
In 2006 Alison Lapper wrote My Life in My Hands, an autobiography chronicling her entire life story from her birth up until when Alison Lapper: Pregnant was erected.

London Vénus: Une vie d'Alison Lapper, an unauthorised biography of Lapper in comic-book form, was published in France in 2022. It is written by Yaneck Chareyre and drawn by Mathieu Bertrand, and tells Lapper's story from her birth to the funeral of Parys Lapper.

== See also ==
- Mouth and foot painting

== Biography ==
- Lapper, Alison (2005). My Life in My Hands. London: Simon & Schuster. ISBN 978-0-7432-7558-3.
