= Sphinx (Marc Quinn sculpture) =

2006 sculpture of Kate Moss

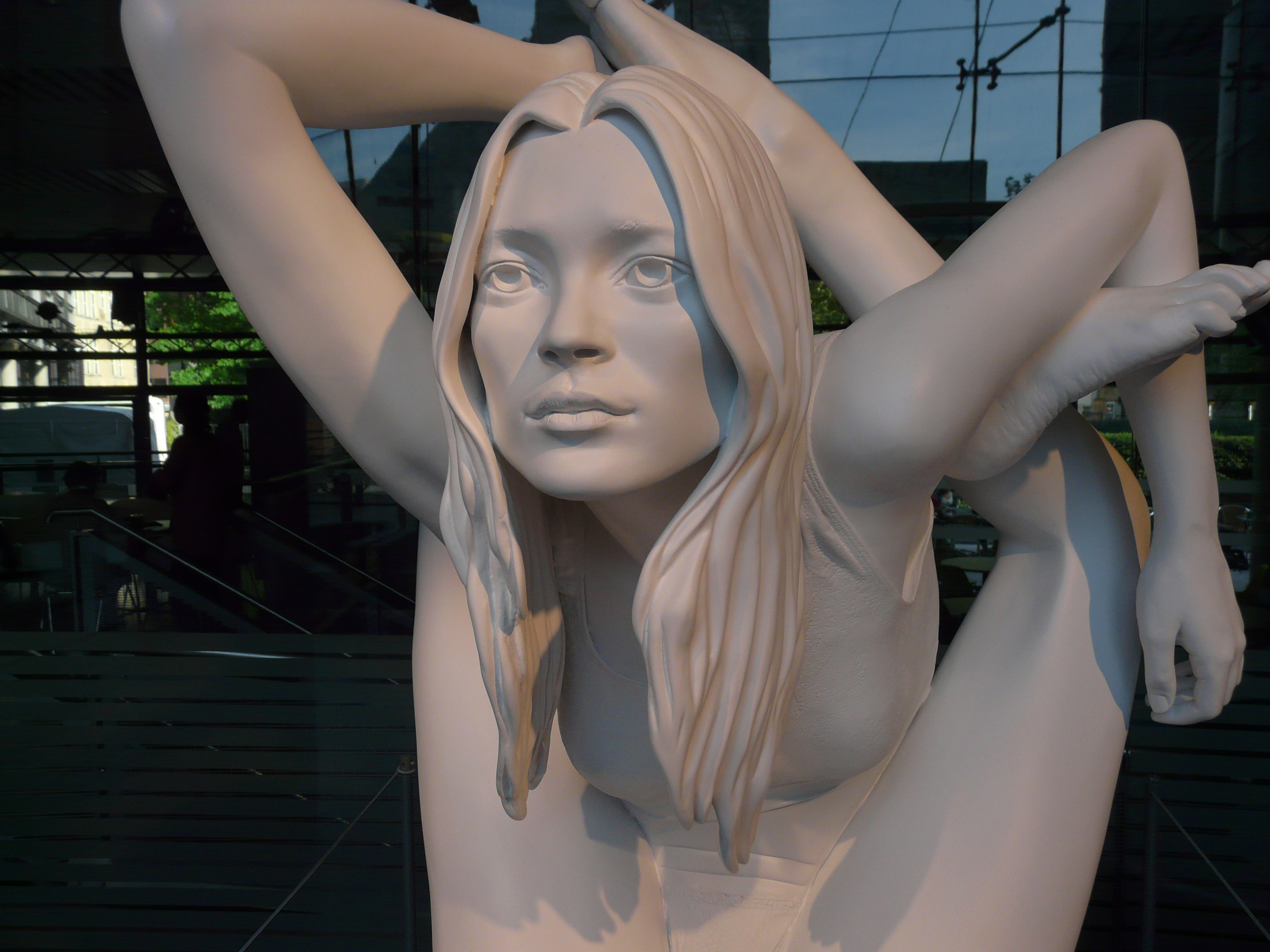
Sphinx in 2008

In 2006, Sphinx, a sculpture of the British fashion model Kate Moss in a complicated yoga position was unveiled by the British sculptor Marc Quinn. The life-size sculpture is made of cast bronze, with a white-painted finish, and shows Moss wearing a leotard with her feet and hands behind her head.

The pose itself was modelled by a more experienced female yoga practitioner, though the body, hands, and feet are based on Moss' measurements, proportions, and earlier lifecastings. Quinn's representation of Moss is meant to show "a mirror of ourselves, a knotted Venus of our age".

== Related statue: Siren ==
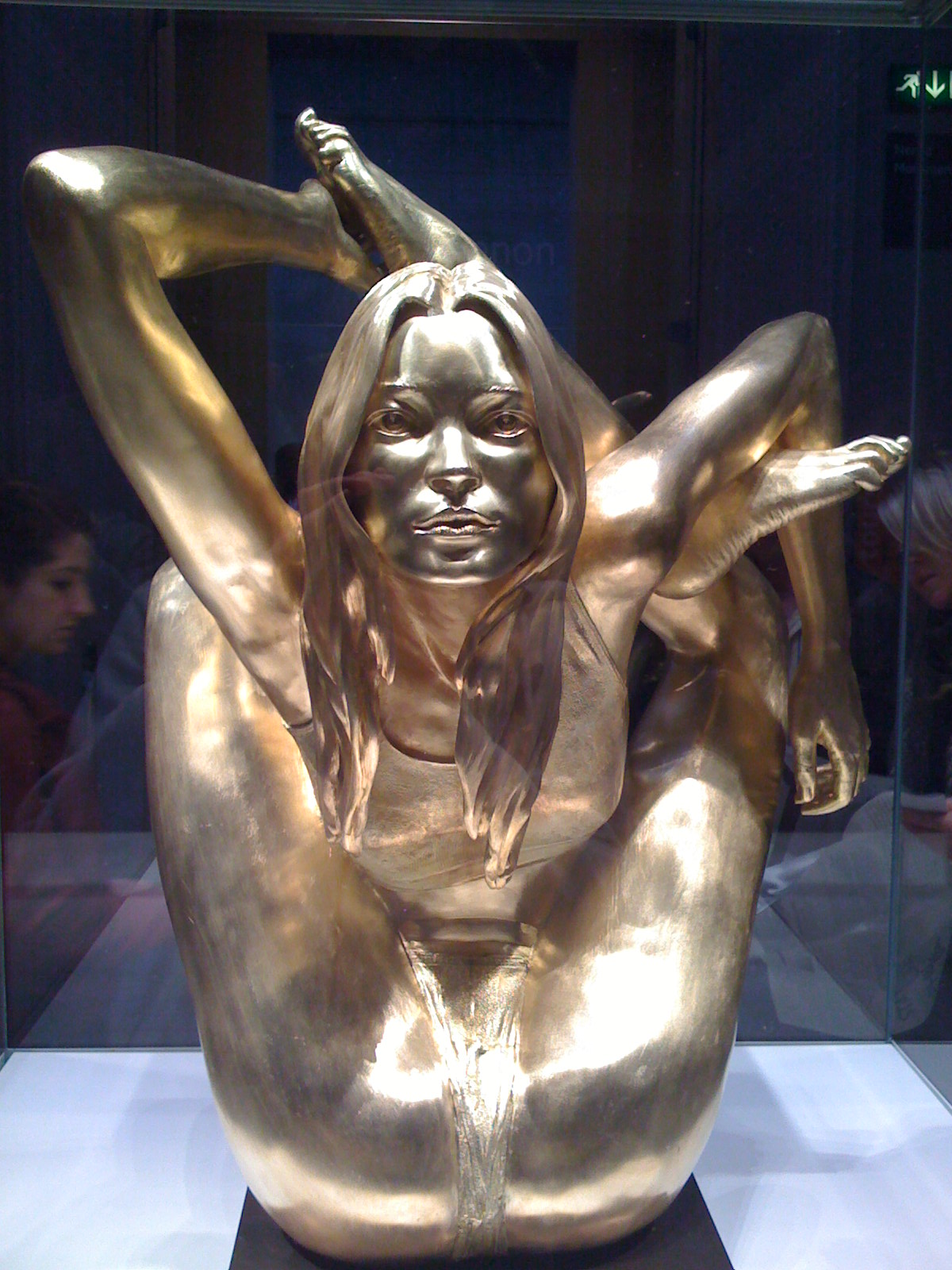
Siren at the British Museum in 2008

The British Museum commissioned Marc Quinn in 2008 to make a life-size sculpture of the model Kate Moss, made entirely of cast gold. The resulting work, also in the yoga position of Sphinx and modeled from Sphinx, was named Siren. It was placed in a show in the museum's Nereid Gallery near the statue of the bathing Aphrodite. While some say the statue is the largest gold sculpture created since the ancient Egyptian era, the claim cannot be verified.
