= The World Today (magazine) =

British global affairs magazine

- Cover of the February/March 2012 issue
- Categories: Global affairs
- Frequency: Quarterly
- Format: Print and online
- Publisher: Chatham House
- Founded: 1945
- Company: Chatham House
- Country: United Kingdom
- Language: English
- Website: www.theworldtoday.org
- ISSN: 0043-9134

The World Today is a quarterly global affairs magazine founded by Chatham House in 1945. It aims to bring the Institute's analysis to a broad audience, featuring internal research alongside external contributors. The World Today publishes analysis, commentary, interviews, book reviews, photography and original reportage.

Prominent contributors include the British journalist Jon Snow, former Prime Minister of New Zealand Helen Clark, British diplomat Martin Griffiths, and Conservative MP Justine Greening.

The magazine is sent to decision-makers in FTSE 100 companies and major embassies in London, as well as to key individuals in the British Parliament, Whitehall, the media, and academia. Magazine subscription is open to individuals and institutions, and it is also included in Chatham House membership.

The World Today replaced the Bulletin of International News, which was published from 1925 to 1945.

== Editors ==
- Liliana Brisby was the editor from 1975 until her retirement in 1983.
- Graham Walker (1946-2016) was the editor from 1995 to 2010.
- Alan Philps was the editor from 2012 to 2021.
- Roxanne Escobales was the editor from May 2021 to 2024.
- Mike Higgins is the current editor.
