= Neil Hughes =

British politician (born 1956)

Councillor on Hackney London Borough Council for Wick
- In office 27 June 1996 – 12 October 2000
- Preceded by: Peter Hoye
- Succeeded by: Jessica Webb

Councillor on Eden District Council for Shap
- In office 1 May 2003 – 7 May 2015
- Preceded by: Maurice Weightman
- Succeeded by: John Owen

Councillor on Cumbria County Council for Eden Lakes
- In office 2 May 2013 – 1 April 2023
- Preceded by: Thomas Lowther
- Succeeded by: Position abolished

Councillor on Westmorland and Furness Council for Eamont and Shap
- In office 5 May 2022 – 31 December 2024
- Preceded by: New position
- Succeeded by: Nicki Vecqueray

Personal details
- Born: 1956 (age 69–70) Liverpool, England
- Party: Liberal Democrat
- Education: University of Aberdeen (dropped out); Open University

Neil Hughes (born 1956) is a retired British Liberal Democrat councillor. From 1964 to 2026, he was one of fourteen participants whose lives were documented in the Up documentary film series.

== Early life ==
Hughes was born in Liverpool, the son of teacher parents. He attended the University of Aberdeen, but dropped out after the first term.

== Career ==
=== Up ===
In 1964, when Hughes was seven years old, he was one of fourteen paricipants chosen to be filmed for Seven Up!, an episode of World in Action documenting the lives of seven-year olds, which would eventually evolve into the Up series. Hughes appeared in all ten instalments.

=== Politics ===
Hughes first joined the Liberal Party in 1982, later becoming a member of that party's successor organisation, the Liberal Democrats. In his early forties, Hughes began a career in politics. Hughes was elected to Wick ward in Hackney, London, in 1996, with 870 votes; he was re-elected in 1998 with 1,233 votes and held the position until 12 October 2000, when he resigned.

In 2003, Hughes was elected to Eden District Council, representing the village of Shap in Cumbria. He was re-elected in 2007 and 2011.

Hughes stood unsuccessfully twice for two general elections: first for Stockton North in 2005 and for Carlisle in 2010.

In the 2005 and 2009 local elections, he was the runner-up in the Eden Lakes division on Cumbria County Council. He was eventually elected in 2013, and was re-elected in 2017.

Hughes was elected to represent Eamont and Shap on Westmorland and Furness Council in 2022. In 2024, Hughes retired as councillor after serving for twenty-one years in Cumbria, for health reasons.

== Personal life ==
Around the time he was twenty-one, he was living in a squat in London; by twenty-eight, was homeless in Scotland; and by thirty-five was housed in the Shetland Islands, where he wrote and appeared in local pantomimes. By the age of forty-two, he was back in London, living in an apartment with Bruce Balden, a fellow Up participant. Hughes has struggled with mental health problems for most of his adulthood.

Hughes has a Bachelor of Arts degree from the Open University.

As of 2026, Hughes was living in France.
