= Kate Moss =

English model and businesswoman (born 1974)

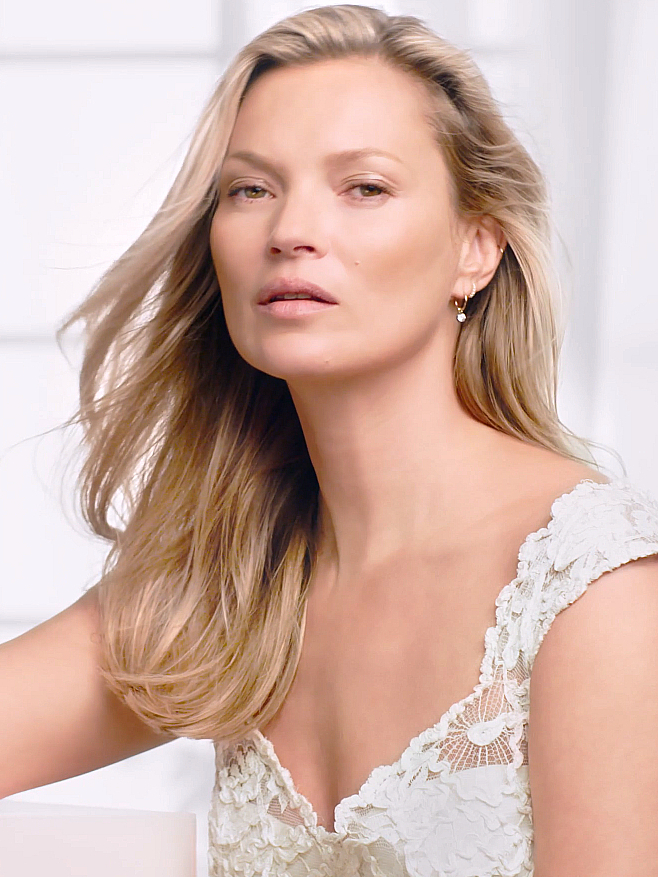
- Moss in 2019
- Born: Katherine Ann Moss; 16 January 1974 (age 52); Croydon, London, England
- Occupations: Model; fashion designer
- Years active: 1988–present
- Spouse: Jamie Hince (m. 2011; div. 2016)
- Children: Lila Moss
- Relatives: Lottie Moss (half-sister)
- Modelling information
- Height: 5 ft 6 in (1.68 m)
- Hair colour: Blonde (dyed)
- Eye colour: Hazel
- Agency: d'management group (Milan); KMA (London)
- Website: katemoss.com

Katherine Ann Moss (born 16 January 1974) is an English model. Arriving towards the end of the "supermodel era", Moss rose to fame in the early 1990s as part of the heroin chic fashion trend. Her collaborations with Calvin Klein brought her to fashion icon status. She is known for her waifish figure, and role in size zero fashion. Moss has had her own clothing range, has been involved in musical projects, and is also a contributing fashion editor for British Vogue. In 2012, she came second on the Forbes top-earning models list, with estimated earnings of $9.2 million in one year. The accolades she has received for modelling include the 2013 British Fashion Awards acknowledging her contribution to fashion over 25 years, while Time named her one of the world's 100 most influential people in 2007.

A subject of media scrutiny due to her partying lifestyle, Moss was involved in a drug-use scandal in September 2005, which led to her being dropped from fashion campaigns. She was cleared of charges and soon resumed modelling. She has inspired cultural depictions including a £1.5m ($2.8m) 18 carat gold statue of her, by Marc Quinn, sculpted in 2008 for a British Museum exhibition.

== Early life ==
Kate Moss was born on 16 January 1974 in Croydon, London, the daughter of Linda Rosina Moss (née Shepherd), a barmaid, and Peter Edward Moss, an airline employee, and raised in the Addiscombe and Sanderstead areas of the borough. She has a younger brother, Nick, and a half-sister named Lottie (Charlotte). Moss's parents divorced when she was 13. She attended Ridgeway Primary School and Riddlesdown High School (now Riddlesdown Collegiate) in Purley. She worked several local retail jobs in her early teens.

== Career ==
=== Beginnings ===
Moss was recruited as a model in 1988 at age 14 by Sarah Doukas, founder of Storm Management, at JFK Airport in New York, after a holiday in The Bahamas. Corinne Day shot black-and-white photographs of her, styled by Melanie Ward, for The Face when she was 16, in a shoot titled "The 3rd Summer of Love". Moss was presented as a young unknown, and Day described the pictures as "dirty realism" or "grunge".

Moss then featured in the Levi's campaign 'Levi's for Girls', with great success, set up by The Design Corporation and again shot by Corinne Day. A further shoot followed for The Face, by Tony Briggs, entitled "Haute Coiffure", In 1992, she appeared in a successful Calvin Klein campaign alongside Mark Wahlberg, followed by her first solo campaign for the company in 1993. Moss went on to become the "anti-supermodel" of the 1990s in contrast to the models of the moment, such as Cindy Crawford, Elle Macpherson, Claudia Schiffer and Naomi Campbell, who were known for their athletic appearance.

Moss was featured in another campaign for Calvin Klein in 1996 that highlighted her lean form in black-and-white photographs. The style of the ads promoted the term "heroin chic" in pop culture and prompted public discussion about her weight. US president Bill Clinton spoke out against the trend. Moss said, "It was just the time. It was a swing from more buxom girls like Cindy Crawford and people were shocked to see what they called a 'waif'. What can you say? How many times can you say 'I'm not anorexic'?"

=== Controversies ===
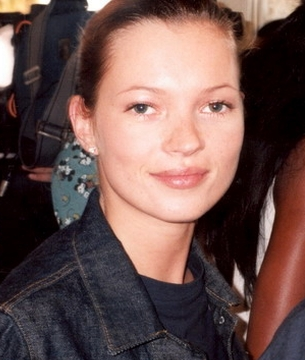
Moss in 2005

On 20 September 2005, the Swedish fashion retailer H&M dropped her from its campaign of autumn clothes designed by Stella McCartney after pictures were published of Moss using cocaine. The contract was reportedly worth £4 million a year. A day later, Chanel said it would not renew its contract with Moss, which was to expire that October, although its decision had nothing to do with the drug scandal. Burberry dropped Moss's campaign with them. Moss apologised, though stopped short of admitting drug use. In 2022, she commented "everybody I knew took drugs".

Moss appeared in ad campaigns for Dior. She was on the cover of the November 2005 W and also inside in a multi-page fashion shoot. She was defended by designer Alexander McQueen, who, during his walk-out after a fashion show, wore a T-shirt saying "We love you Kate". In March 2006, she appeared in the finale of his show The Widows of Culloden, as a life-sized illusion projected into a glass pyramid. Artist Stella Vine also supported Moss, and paintings by Vine, painted during the scandal, were exhibited and reproduced in the press.

On 5 January 2006, the London Metropolitan Police asked Moss to return from the US to Britain to answer questions about the September 2005 cocaine scandal. On 16 June 2006, British police dropped the charges for lack of evidence. Ultimately, Moss was cleared of all charges and resumed her modelling career. In 2015, Moss was escorted off an EasyJet flight by police after she became disruptive.

=== Later work ===
Moss has been featured in ad campaigns with Chanel, Louis Vuitton, Balmain, Versace, Balenciaga, Burberry, Stuart Weitzman, Rag & Bone, Alexander Wang, David Yurman, Givenchy, Roberto Cavalli, Kerastase, Isabel Marant, Yves Saint Laurent, Dior, Gucci, Dolce & Gabbana, Calvin Klein, Alexander McQueen, Equipment, Rimmel, and Bulgari. She has been on the cover and in fashion spreads for most magazines including UK, US, and French Vogue (as well as other international versions of Vogue), Another Man, Harper's Bazaar, Vanity Fair, the Face, and W. She has been on the cover of British Vogue 30 times, shot the inaugural covers for both Russian Vogue with Amber Valletta and Japanese Vogue, in addition to dozens of other international Vogue covers.

Moss has been on the cover of 17 issues of W, including one with nine different covers that featured her. W named Moss its muse (September 2003 issue). Moss has also featured on the inaugural covers of Numéro, Numéro Tokyo and Spanish L'Officiel. She has worked extensively with photographers such as Mario Testino, Mario Sorrenti, Steven Klein, Juergen Teller, Steven Meisel and Peter Lindbergh, and won the Vogue/CFDA award from the Fashion Designers of America in July 2005 as Fashion Inspiration. April 2005 saw the launch of a Rimmel London mascara TV ad featuring leather-clad Moss motorcycling through London to the rock song "Another Cold Beer" by Steven Crayn.

Twelve months after her cocaine scandal, Moss signed 18 contracts for autumn-winter 2006 including Rimmel, Agent Provocateur, Virgin Mobile, Calvin Klein and Burberry. Moss designed a collection, with Katy England, for Topshop. Moss launched a fragrance and body lotion range bearing her name in association with Coty in 2007. In November 2006, Moss was model of the year at the British Fashion Awards, the top accolade in British fashion, but the award stirred fresh controversy.

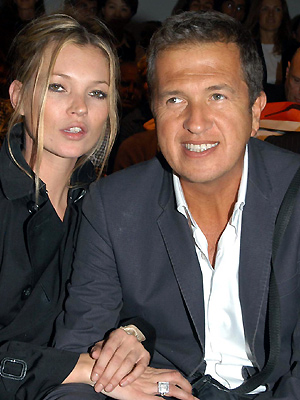
Moss with Mario Testino in 2007

On 1 May 2007, clothes designed by Moss for Topshop were launched in the chain's 225 UK stores. A Moss "countdown to launch" board filled a window of the company's Oxford Street store and on 30 April Moss launched the clothing there, briefly appearing in the window modelling a red dress from the collection just before the shop opened. Topshop reportedly paid Moss £3 million. The 50 designs included clothes, bags, shoes and belts, prices from £12 for a vest top to £150 for a cropped leather jacket. Clothes included skinny jeans, one-shoulder minidresses and T-shirts with K woven into the design. In a collaboration with Coty, Moss has released four fragrances.

In early 2010, she designed handbags for Longchamp. In 2012, Moss modelled for the spring-summer collection for Supreme. Moss has represented Mango since 2011. In November 2012, Australian model Miranda Kerr replaced Moss for spring/summer 2013.

In January 2012, having seen Dutch illusionist Hans Klok on the BBC's The One Show, Moss recommended Stella McCartney book him for London Fashion Week the following month. It was planned that Moss, a magic fan, would be Klok's assistant, and she rehearsed three illusions, a levitation, a sawing in half and a guillotine illusion. However, she dropped out with temporary paralysis of her right arm due to a trapped nerve, and her place was taken by Alexa Chung.

Also in 2012, Moss appeared in the video of George Michael's White Light, inspired by his pneumonia. Moss performed with Naomi Campbell in the closing ceremony of the 2012 London Olympic Games on 12 August 2012.

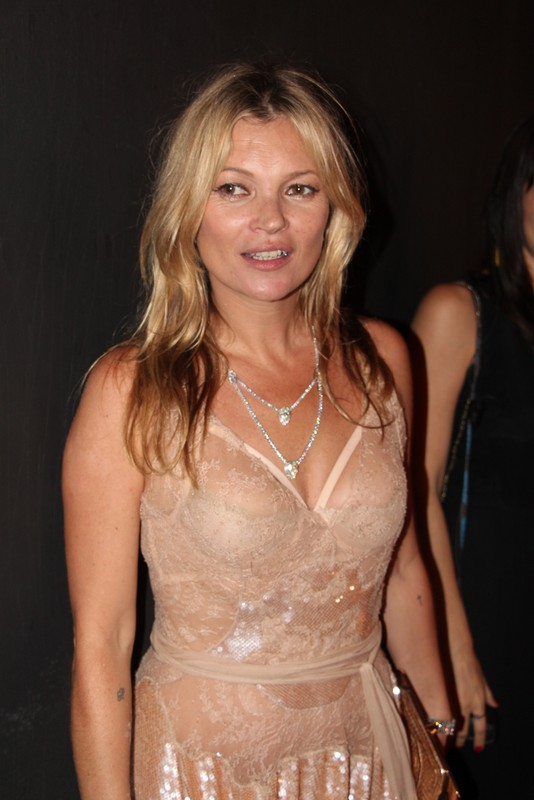
Moss in 2015

Moss posed nude for the 60th-anniversary issue of Playboy in December 2013. That same month, she received a Special Recognition award at the British Fashion Awards to acknowledge her contribution to fashion during her 25-year career. At the 2014 Brit Awards in February, Moss collected David Bowie's Brit Award for Best British Male, while wearing a one-piece printed "woodland creatures" costume, as worn originally by Bowie. On 30 April 2014, Moss's second collection for Topshop was unveiled. Her first collection with Topshop resulted in a long-lasting relationship with the brand.

In September 2016, Moss founded Kate Moss Agency (KMA). Her clients include Rita Ora, Jordan Barrett and Esmé Creed-Miles.

== Public image ==
Moss was voted 9th of Maxim's "50 Sexiest Women of 1999" and 22nd in FHM's "100 Sexiest Women of 1995". Arena named her sexiest woman in its 150th issue. She was on the November 1999 Millennium cover of American Vogue as one of the "Modern Muses". In March 2007, Moss won the Sexiest Woman NME Award. In 2012 she was included on MODELS.com's 'The Supers' list.

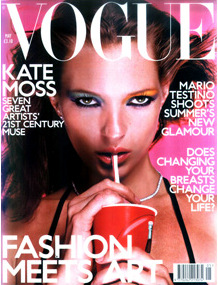
Moss on the cover of the May 2000 UK edition of Vogue magazine, photographed by Sarah Morris

While not officially confirmed by either, Noel Gallagher was speculated to have written the popular Oasis single "Sunday Morning Call" about her. The song reached number 4 in the UK and number 3 in Scotland.

Moss was the subject of an expressionist nude painting by artist Lucian Freud, who painted her in 2002 while she was pregnant. The work sold at Christie's in 2005 for £3.93 million. In 2007, Chuck Close created a portrait of her, translating daguerreotypes of Moss into jacquard tapestry. In October 2010, she appeared on the cover of Bryan Ferry's album Olympia. The National Portrait Gallery, London maintains seven portraits of Moss among its collections, shot by photographers including Mario Testino, Corinne Day and Sølve Sundsbø.

A £1.5m ($2.8m) 18 carat gold statue of Moss in 2008 was part of a British Museum exhibition. Entitled Siren, the 50 kg (110 lb) hollow statue was made by Marc Quinn, who described Moss as "the ideal beauty of the moment". The statue is said to be the largest gold statue to be created since the era of Ancient Egypt. Quinn had previously made a painted-bronze, life-size sculpture of Moss in a contorted yoga pose, titled Sphinx.

The cello rock group Rasputina had a song entitled "Kate Moss" on their 1996 album Thanks for the Ether.

Moss has earned awards for style, including the Council of Fashion Designers of America's fashion influence award and a place on the Vanity Fair international best-dressed list. In the early part of the 21st century, she was, together with actress Sienna Miller, one of the main proponents of boho-chic. She appeared on the cover of Vanity Fair's September 2006 style issue. In recent years, she has popularised denim cutoff shorts, Ugg boots and the Balenciaga handbag.

In 2008, Moss was added to PETA's 'Worst-Dressed' Celebrities of 2008' because of her frequent use of fur. In 2012, Moss was among the British cultural icons selected by artist Sir Peter Blake to appear in a new version of his most famous artwork – the Beatles' Sgt. Pepper's Lonely Hearts Club Band album cover – to celebrate the British cultural figures of his life that he most admires.

In 2013, the Belgian pop singer Stromae wrote Kate Moss into the lyrics of the song "Tous les mêmes", singing "il n'y a que Kate Moss qui est éternelle", translating into English as, "there's only Kate Moss who is eternal".

Moss was interviewed by Women's Wear Daily in 2009 and was quoted saying the phrase "Nothing tastes as good as skinny feels", which she described as a "motto". She was heavily criticised for the phrase, being "accused of encouraging eating disorders". Moss later regretted saying it.

== Other ventures ==
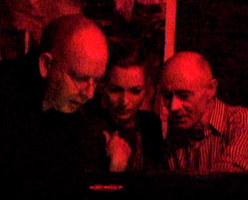
Alan McGee, Moss, and BP Fallon DJing at Death Disco NY in 2004

Moss appeared on Oasis singles "Don't Go Away" (1998) and "Fade Away" (1994), and on the Be Here Now album (1997), playing tambourine, Johnny Depp playing a guitar. She has appeared in music videos such as "Kowalski" by Primal Scream, "I Just Don't Know What to Do with Myself" by the White Stripes, "Something About the Way You Look Tonight" by Elton John, "Sex with Strangers" by Marianne Faithfull, "Love Don't Bother Me" by Stage Dolls, "Delia's Gone" and "God's Gonna Cut You Down" by Johnny Cash, and "Queenie Eye" by Paul McCartney.

She has also provided vocals for songs by Primal Scream (the 2003 version of "Some Velvet Morning"), Babyshambles ("La Belle et la Bête") and the Lemonheads ("You're a Dirty Robot"). Prior to breaking up with Pete Doherty, Moss co-wrote four songs on Babyshambles' second album Shotter's Nation—"You Talk", "French Dog Blues", "Baddie's Boogie", and "Deft Left Hand".

In 1999, Moss played a non musical role in the British screen comedy Blackadder: Back & Forth, appearing both as Maid Marian and as a fictional Queen of England. Director and writer Richard Curtis said in the "making of" video that they wanted "the best looking woman in England" to play the role. In 2014, she made an acting cameo as herself in The Boy in the Dress.

Moss has put her name to four perfume lines. Her first one, the original, is named "Kate Moss". Other perfumes include Vintage Muse, Lila Belle and Love Blossoms.

A biopic film by James Lucas titled Moss & Freud, about the creation of Freud's painting of Moss, was released in 2026. The film features Ellie Bamber as Moss and Derek Jacobi as Lucian Freud.

== Philanthropy ==
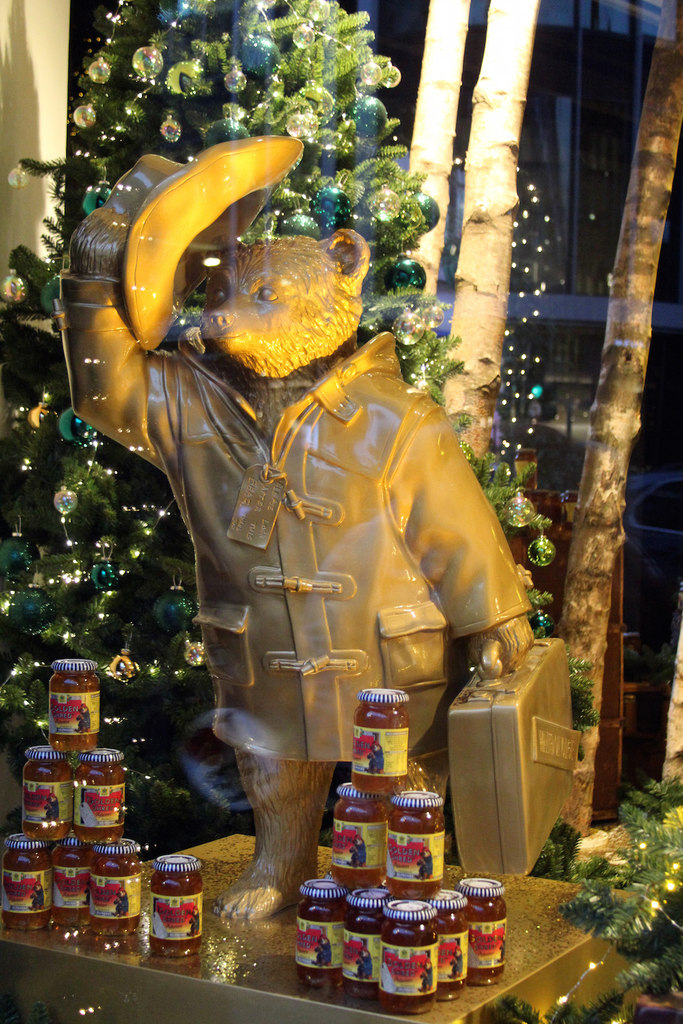
Moss's Paddington Bear statue—"Goldie Bear"—in Selfridges department store in London in 2014, auctioned to raise funds for the NSPCC

Moss supported War Child. She also designed a charm in a necklace for Wallis in 2007 in aid of Cancer Research UK and said "I am happy to give my support to help fund crucial research, as so many lives are affected by this terrible disease."

She has also helped to launch the SamandRuby charity in March 2006. The charity was started to provide funding for the education and shelter of Thai children. The SamandRuby organisation is named after a friend of Moss's, Samantha Archer Fayet, and her 6-month-old daughter Ruby Rose who were killed by the tsunami while visiting Thailand.

Moss also supports the Elton John AIDS Foundation, the Hoping Foundation, the Lucie Blackman Trust, Make Poverty History, Comic Relief and Homes of Hope. On 22 November 2006, Moss recorded an appearance in a Little Britain sketch for Comic Relief at the Hammersmith Apollo as a character called Katie Pollard, sister of Vicky Pollard played by Matt Lucas.

Moss made a short film with Misery Bear for the March 2011 Comic Relief event entitled "Misery Bear's Comic Relief Starring Kate Moss".

In November 2014, Moss designed a Paddington Bear statue, one of fifty created by various celebrities which were located around London prior to the release of the film Paddington, with the statues auctioned to raise funds for the National Society for the Prevention of Cruelty to Children (NSPCC).

== Personal life ==
Moss was in a relationship with actor Johnny Depp between 1994 and 1998. She has a daughter, Lila Moss (born Lila Grace Moss Hack, and who is also a model), born in September 2002, with Dazed & Confused editor Jefferson Hack, with whom she was in a relationship for a number of years in the early 2000s. She is godmother to Iris Law, the daughter of Sadie Frost and Jude Law.

Moss had a relationship with Libertines member Pete Doherty, first meeting him at her 31st birthday party in January 2005. On 11 April 2007, Doherty announced Moss as his fiancée during one of his concerts in London, at which Moss also performed. In July 2007, Moss and Doherty split.

Moss married Jamie Hince, guitarist of The Kills, on 1 July 2011 at St Peter's Church, Southrop, Gloucestershire. In 2015 the couple separated, and divorced the following year. She has since been in a relationship with British photographer Count Nikolai von Bismarck of the German aristocratic family.

In 2011, Moss bought 3, The Grove, Highgate, as her London home, selling it in 2022 to relocate to the Cotswolds.

According to Forbes, her 2004–2005 earnings were $5 million and her 2005–2006 earnings were $8 million. In 2007, with estimated earnings of $9 million, Forbes magazine named her second on the list of the World's 15 top-earning models list. She made her first appearance in the British women's Sunday Times Rich List in 2007, where she was estimated to be worth £45 million. She ranked as the 99th richest woman in Britain. In the 2009 Rich List, she was ranked as the 1,348th richest person in the UK, with a net worth of £40 million.

== Filmography ==
Year	Title	Role
1999	Blackadder: Back & Forth	Maid Marian
2014	The Boy in the Dress	Herself
2016	Ab Fab: The Movie	Herself
2016	Zoolander 2	Herself
2017	Red Nose Day Actually	Herself
2026	Confessions II	Herself

== Biographic publications ==
In 2012, Rizzoli Publications released, Kate: The Kate Moss Book. written by Moss in collaboration with creative director Jefferson Hack, Fabien Baron, and Jess Hallett. The book is a personal retrospective of her career, tracing her evolution from "new girl with potential" to one of the most iconic models of all time.

Kate: The Kate Moss Book includes photography by Arthur Elgort, Corinne Day, Craig McDean, David Sims, Hedi Slimane, Inez & Vinoodh, Juergen Teller, Mario Sorrenti, Mario Testino, Mert & Marcus, Nick Knight, Patrick Demarchelier, Peter Lindbergh, Roxanne Lowit, Steven Klein, Terry Richardson and others.
