= Born to Be Different =

British documentary series

- Genre: Documentary
- Composer: Julian Stewart Lindsay
- Country of origin: United Kingdom
- Original language: English
- No. of series: 10
- No. of episodes: 17

Production
- Running time: 49 minutes

Original release
- Network: Channel 4
- Release: 17 June 2003 – 2020

Born to Be Different is a British documentary series on Channel 4, which follows the lives of six disabled children who were born in the millennium. Series 10 began in the UK on 26 March 2020.

== Children ==
- William Davis – Lives with tuberous sclerosis, which causes him to have autism and epilepsy. He died in 2023 at the age of 24.
- Hamish McLean – Lives with dwarfism.
- Zoe Frew – Lives with arthrogryposis.
- Shelbie Williams – Lives with trisomy 9. She died in 2019.
- Emily Speirs – Lives with spina bifida.
- Nathan Christie – Lives with Down syndrome. (Note: Nathan dropped out of the series after series 8)

== Overview ==
Born to Be Different is directed by Anna Stickland. The first series, released in 2003, looks at the first year of the children's lives. The second series, released in 2004, looks at the children's lives as they reach two years of age. The third series, released in 2005, follows the children as they turn three. The fourth series, released in 2007, looks at the children's lives between the ages of three and four. The fifth series, released in 2009, focuses on the children at the ages of six and seven. The sixth series, released in 2010, focuses on the children at the ages of eight and nine. The seventh series, released in 2011, follows the lives of the children between the ages of nine and ten. The eighth series, released in 2010, follows the children as the turn eleven and start secondary school. The ninth series, released in 2016, looks the lives of the children at the age of sixteen. The tenth series was released in 2020.

== Critical reception ==
Reviewing the show, TimesOnline commented with irony that "by the end of [it], we had sobered up entirely. A queasy feeling followed, of being pulled morally up and down and in and out until you didn't know whom you pitied or why. The sign, in other words, of excellent television."

In its review, The London Paper expressed concerns about the voyeuristic approach of the show and asks: "what is to be gained from watching harried mothers breaking down, and children being constantly reminded of their problems by the camera crew? [...] Let’s just hope Channel 4's intentions were in the right place."

The music for the series was composed by Julian Stewart Lindsay.

== See also ==
- Up (film series)
- Child of Our Time
