= Up New Generation =

British TV series (2000–)

- Genre: Documentary
- Directed by: Julian Farino
- Starring: Talan Gordon; Orala Johnson; Asif Lateef; Sanchez Payne; Gemma Roberts; Ryan Sheridan; Stacey Tideswell; Alexandra Whitton
- Narrated by: Alun Armstrong
- Country of origin: United Kingdom
- Original language: English

Original release
- Network: BBC One
- Release: 13 April 2000

Up New Generation is a new version of the Up series of documentary films, following the lives of a group of individuals who were seven years old at the turn of the millennium.

The series is directed by Julian Farino and began with 7Up 2000, first broadcast in April 2000. The second instalment, 14 Up 2000, aired in two parts on BBC One in September 2007.

21 Up New Generation was broadcast in September 2014 in two parts, while 28 Up was broadcast on BBC One from 29 September 2021 with the new subtitle Millennium Generation. Also in 2021, the five previous programmes were added to the BBC iPlayer for viewers of the new episodes to watch.

== 28 Up: Millennium Generation ==
28 Up: Millennium Generation is a two-part documentary made by ITV for the BBC via their factual programming division Multistory Media, the company behind Michael Apted's 63 Up from 2019. Both episodes are 60 minutes in length, with the first episode featuring five participants from the original 2000 documentary.

Episode 1 was broadcast on BBC One on 29 September 2021 and featured Oliver, Ben from Mull, Gemma, BMX biker John and radio DJ Sanchez. Episode 2 was broadcast the following week and featured Ryan from Bolton, songwriter Orala, Talan from Cornwall and Stacey, who has been teaching in China for eight years.

== List of films and premiere dates ==
No.	Title	Director	Original air date	Channel	Length
1	7Up 2000	Julian Farino	13 April 2000	BBC	89 minutes
2	14 Up 2000	Julian Farino	16 September 2007	BBC	118 minutes
3	21 Up New Generation	Julian Farino	7 September 2014	BBC	119 minutes
4	28 Up: Millennium Generation	Julian Farino	29 September 2021	BBC	119 minutes

== Participation record ==
Age (Year)		7 (2000)	14 (2007)	21 (2014)	28 (2021)
1	Alexandra	Yes	Yes	Yes	No
2	Asif	Yes	Yes	Yes	No
3	Ben	Yes	Yes	No	Yes
4	Courtney	Yes	Yes	Yes	Yes
5	Gemma	Yes	Yes	Yes	Yes
6	Hannah	Yes	Yes	No	Yes
7	Henna	Yes	Yes	No	No
8	Jamie	Yes	Yes	Yes	No
9	John	Yes	Yes	Yes	Yes
10	Oliver	Yes	Yes	Yes	Yes
11	Orala	Yes	Yes	Yes	Yes
12	Owen	Yes	Yes	Yes	Yes
13	Rosie	Yes	No	No	No
14	Ryan	Yes	Yes	Yes	Yes
15	Sanchez	Yes	Yes	Yes	Yes
16	Sophie	Yes	Yes	No	No
17	Stacey	Yes	Yes	Yes	Yes
18	Taime	Yes	No	No	No
19	Talan	Yes	Yes	Yes	Yes
