= Born in the USSR: 21 Up =

- Directed by: Sergei Miroshnichenko
- Narrated by: James McAvoy
- Country of origin: United Kingdom
- Original language: English

Production
- Producer: Jemma Jupp
- Running time: 75 min.

Original release
- Release: 2005

Born in the USSR: 21 Up is a 2005 British documentary, directed by Sergei Miroshnichenko.

Following in the tradition of the original UK Up Series, this documentary revisits a group of Soviet Union-born children at seven-year intervals to track their development against a backdrop of social and political change. Following the success of the UK original, this film looks at life for a group of young people from the former Soviet Union. The adults here, all introduced to viewers at the age of seven and seen again at 14, were born in a country that no longer exists. Their stories provide an insight into the break-up of the former Soviet Union as well as a reflection of what life has become without Communism.

Since filming started 14 years ago, some of the youngsters have left the former USSR to go to Israel or the United States, some have stayed in their family home, but all have had their lives changed. Archival footage of them at the ages of seven and 14, and now new material at 21, shows life in a society that was once shut off from the world.

The film was nominated for Best Editing - Factual in the 2006 BAFTA awards.

The documentary was followed by Born in the USSR: 28 Up in 2012.

== Russian Edit ==
A version edited by Miroshnichenko totaling 3 hours was shown on TV channel "Russia" in June 2007. It was the film first run on Russia's National Television and the former-Soviet Union. The documentary is divided into two parts: "Confusion of tongues" and "Mountain of Megiddo". This longer and more thorough version will include all the children from the previous documentaries and not only the selected children featured in the UK version. However, because of the agreement with the distributor company, this version cannot be shown outside the former Soviet Union. A similar version has been shown to selected audiences when Miroshnichenko visited the United States in April 2007.

In 2008 the film became a winner of three awards in Russian Cinematograph: Nika, Zolotoi Orel and Stalker.
