= Byron (film) =

- Genre: Drama
- Written by: Nick Dear
- Directed by: Julian Farino
- Starring: Jonny Lee Miller; Vanessa Redgrave
- Country of origin: United Kingdom
- Original language: English
- No. of episodes: 2

Production
- Executive producers: Laura Mackie; Hilary Salmon; Andrea Miller
- Producer: Ruth Baumgarten
- Running time: 75 minutes
- Production company: BBC

Original release
- Network: BBC Two
- Release: 27 September – 28 September 2003

Byron is a 2003 British television film based on the adult life of English poet Lord Byron. Written by Nick Dear and directed by Julian Farino, it features Jonny Lee Miller in the title role alongside Vanessa Redgrave who portrays Lady Melbourne. It was first aired by the BBC in two, 75 minute parts in September 2003.

== Cast ==
Actor	Character
Jonny Lee Miller	Lord Byron
Stephen Campbell Moore	John Cam Hobhouse
Oliver Milburn	Scrope Davies
Philip Glenister	William Fletcher
Vanessa Redgrave	Lady Melbourne
Natasha Little	Augusta Leigh
Camilla Power	Lady Caroline Lamb
Julie Cox	Annabella Milbanke
Oliver Dimsdale	Percy Bysshe Shelley
Sally Hawkins	Mary Shelley

== Episodes ==
No.	Title	Original release date	UK viewers (millions)
1	"The Summer of a Dormouse"	27 September 2003	2.1
In 1811, Lord Byron and Hobhouse leave the Greek-speaking parts of the Ottoman Caliphate; they return to England where Byron meets with John Murray to sell his poems. Byron is working on Childe Harold's Pilgrimage. Byron is a member of the House of Lords in the 1810s. The Luddites are active destroying the machines of the industrial age to save their jobs. Lady Caroline Lamb becomes infatuated with Lord Byron. Concurrently, Lady Milbanke grows very close to him.
2	"The Eloquence of Action"	28 September 2003	1.8
Notwithstanding his marriage to Annabella Millbanke, Byron still wants to carry on his romance with his half-sister Augusta Leigh. Faced with public scorn, Byron goes abroad and meets Percy Bysshe Shelley in 1816 in Venice in the Kingdom of Lombardy–Venetia. Later grieving the death of his illegitimate daughter Allegra, Byron sails to the Ottoman Empire to help the Greeks break off their Muslim rulers.

== Production ==
The drama was announced in November 2002 by BBC Controller of Drama Commissioning Jane Tranter, written by Nick Dear and to be directed by Julian Farino. Writing about the announcement for The Daily Telegraph, Tom Leonard said that the production "is the latest example of the corporation's fixation with producing period dramas that are 'relevant to a modern audience'". It was produced by Ruth Baumgarten with executive producers Laura Mackie, Hilary Salmon and Andrea Miller.

Miller said that as a result of his portrayal, his opinion of Byron was that: "He had the ability to be an extraordinarily nice, kind man but he could also be really quite cruel when he made his mind up about somebody. I certainly don't like the way he treated some people."

Lady Caroline Lamb was seen by Power as a "child woman, incredibly vulnerable and one of those people with a huge life force".

== Reception ==
According to overnight figures, 2.1 million viewers (12% audience share) saw the first part with 1.8 million viewers (11% share) watching the second following the BBC Two broadcast.

In a preview ahead of its airing on BBC America in 2005, The New York Times said that the film "paints a sympathetic, at times serious-minded portrait without glossing over his vanity and artful affectations", and that Miller "skillfully blends his restless passion and moments of sour self-awareness". Writing for British Film Institute's Screenonline website, Alexander Larman also praised Miller's performance, saying in a profile of the actor that his portrayal of Byron was "sensitive and nuanced". Peter Cochran described Miller as "outstanding in the lead: the most successful screen Byron there is".

Jenny Bevan won the Costume Design (Drama) award at the Royal Television Society Craft and Design Awards in 2004 for her work on the production. The awards also saw John Paul Kelly nominated in the Production Design (Drama) category.
