= Nick Hitchon =

Nuclear fusion scientist (1957–2023)

- Born: William Nicholas Guy Hitchon; 22 October 1957; Skipton, North Yorkshire, England
- Died: 23 July 2023 (aged 65)
- Education: University of Oxford (DPhil)
- Occupations: Scientist, academic
- Spouse(s): Jacqui Bush (m. 1979, divorced) Cryss Brunner (m. 2001)
- Children: 1

William Nicholas Guy Hitchon (22 October 1957 – 23 July 2023) was a nuclear fusion scientist and professor at the University of Wisconsin. He is also known as a participant of the Up documentary series between 1964 and 2026.

== Early life and education ==
Hitchon was born in Skipton, West Riding of Yorkshire (now North Yorkshire), the eldest of three sons to Iona (née Hall) and Guy Hitchon. He was educated at Ermysted's Grammar School, Skipton, from 1968 to 1975. Later, he earned a bachelor's and master's degree in physics from Oxford University and a D.Phil. in engineering science from the same university.

== Career ==
In 1964, Hitchon was featured as a child in the Seven Up! documentary for ITV's World in Action series. His life was revisited at seven-year intervals in subsequent episodes by director Michael Apted until 2019. Before his death he filmed an interview for the series' final programme, 70 Up.

In 1982, Hitchon joined the University of Wisconsin, Madison, in the department of electrical and computer engineering. He became a professor in 1994 and served as the department chair from 1999 to 2002. In 2022, he took retirement. During his tenure, he authored three books.

== Personal life ==
Hitchon was married twice. His first marriage, in 1979, was to Jacqui Bush, who accompanied him when he moved to the United States, and with whom he had a son, but from whom he was later divorced. His second marriage, in 2001, was to Cryss Brunner.

== Bibliography ==
- Hitchon, W. N. G. (1999). Plasma Processes for Semiconductor Fabrication. Cambridge Studies in Semiconductor Physics and Microelectronic Engineering. Cambridge: Cambridge University Press. doi:10.1017/CBO9780511529511. ISBN 978-0-521-59175-1.
