= Marc Quinn =

British painter and sculptor

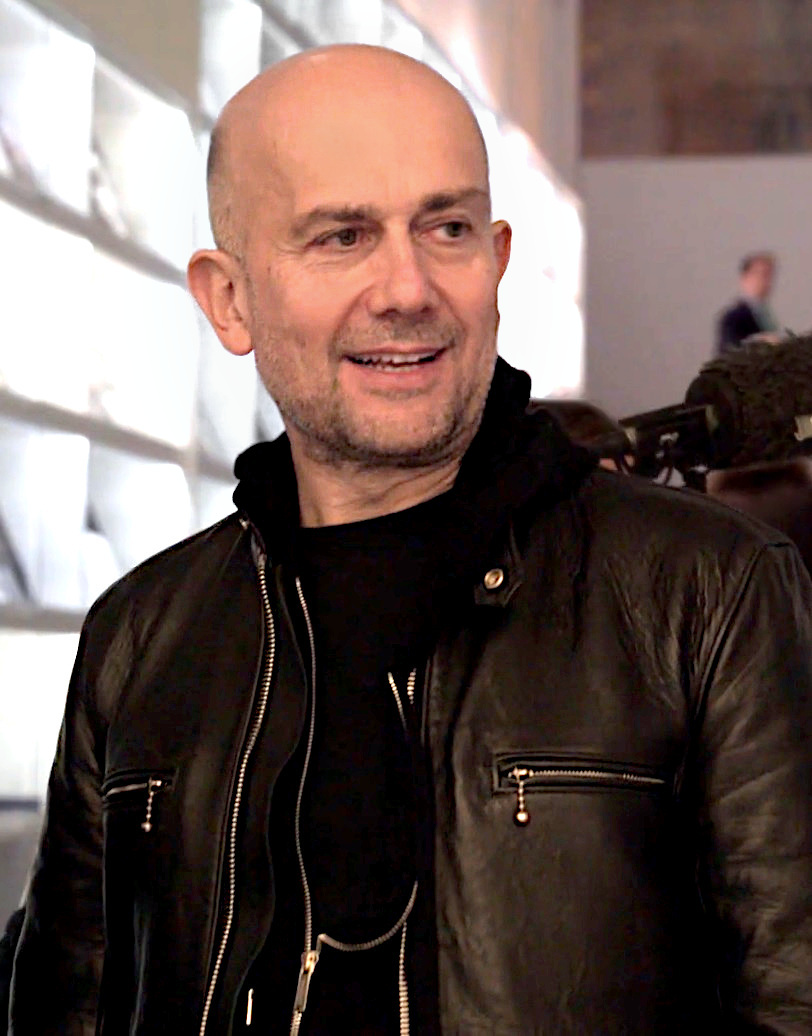
- Quinn in 2017
- Born: 8 January 1964 (age 62); London, England
- Education: Robinson College, Cambridge
- Occupation: Visual artist
- Known for: Contemporary art, Young British artists
- Awards: 2004 – 4th Plinth Commission for Trafalgar Square, London
- Website: marcquinn.com

Marc Quinn (born 8 January 1964) is a British contemporary visual artist whose work includes sculpture, installation, and painting. Quinn explores "what it is to be human in the world today" through subjects including the body, genetics, identity, environment, and the media. His work has used materials that vary widely, from blood, bread and flowers, to marble and stainless steel. Quinn has been the subject of solo exhibitions at Sir John Soane's Museum, the Tate Gallery, National Portrait Gallery, Fondation Beyeler, Fondazione Prada, and South London Gallery. The artist was a notable member of the Young British Artists movement.

Quinn exhibits internationally. He was awarded the commission for the first edition of the Fourth Plinth in Trafalgar Square in 2004, for which he exhibited Alison Lapper Pregnant. Quinn's frozen self-portrait series made of his own blood, Self (1991–present) was subject to a retrospective at Fondation Beyeler in 2009.

Quinn lives and works in London.

== Life and career ==
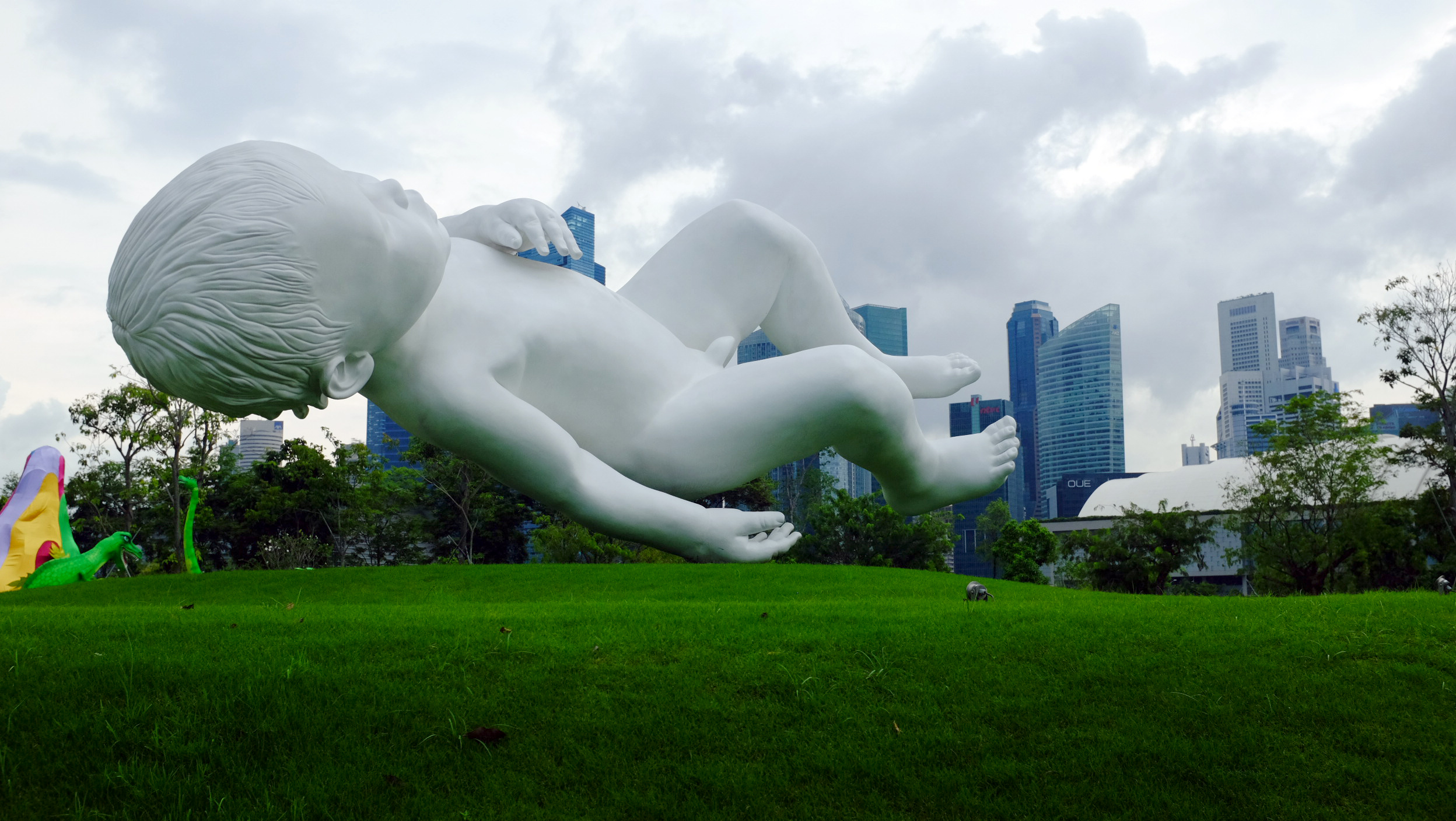
Planet by Marc Quinn in Singapore

Quinn was born in London on 8 January 1964 to a French mother and a British father. He spent his early years in Paris, where his father was a physicist working at the BIPM (Bureau International des Poids et Mesures). Quinn recalls an early fascination with the scientific instruments in his father's laboratory, in particular atomic clocks. He attended Millfield (a private boarding-school in Somerset), and studied history and history of art at Robinson College, Cambridge.

In the early 1990s, Quinn was the first artist to be represented by gallerist Jay Jopling. The artist had his first exhibition with Jopling in 1991, exhibiting Self (1991), a frozen self-portrait made out of nine pints of the artist's blood.

During the 1990s, Quinn and several peers were identified for their radical approach to the making and experiencing of art. In 1992, the loosely affiliated group was called the 'Young British Artists' by writer Michael Corris in Artforum, and included Cornelia Parker, Sarah Lucas, Damien Hirst, Rachel Whiteread, and Tracey Emin.

In 1995, Quinn was given a solo exhibition at Tate Britain where new sculptures were shown as part of the Art Now series. In 1997 Quinn's work Self (1991), was exhibited at the Royal Academy, London for the exhibition Sensation. Quinn's Self, along with works by Sarah Lucas and Damien Hirst, were already well known to the British public. The exhibition received widespread media attention and had a record number of visitors for a contemporary art exhibition. The exhibition then travelled to the Hamburger Bahnhof, Berlin, and to the Brooklyn Museum, New York.

In 1998, he was given a solo exhibition at the South London Gallery, and in 1999, he had a solo exhibition at Kunstverein Hannover. The Groninger Museum presented a solo exhibition of Quinn's work in 2000. The artist was then invited to present a solo exhibition at the Fondazione Prada in Milan in 2000, where he presented an ambitious new work Garden. In 2002, he was given a solo exhibition at Tate Liverpool which included new works and photography, and coincided with the Liverpool Biennial, where Quinn presented 1+1=3. In 2001, the National Portrait Gallery gave Quinn a solo exhibition for his genomic portrait of Sir John Sulston.

In 2004 Quinn was awarded the first ever commission for the Fourth Plinth in London's Trafalgar Square, for which he produced a marble sculpture of pregnant disabled artist, Alison Lapper.

In 2006, Museo d'Arte Contemporanea Rome presented Marc Quinn's works in a solo exhibition focused on his recent figurative sculpture, and in 2009, the Fondation Beyeler presented a solo exhibition of Marc Quinn's ongoing series Self, including all sculptures from 1991 to 2006.

In 2012, Quinn was commissioned to produce a monumental work for the opening ceremony of the Paralympic Games at the London Olympics 2012, for which he produced Breath, a monumental sculpture of Alison Lapper held up by air.

In 2013, Quinn presented a solo exhibition curated by Germano Celant during the 55th Venice Biennale for art, at Fondazione Giorgio Cini, Venice in a show of more than 50 works.

Quinn's first monograph Memory Box by Germano Celant was published in 2013. A feature-length documentary about Quinn's life and work, Making Waves, was released in 2014, produced and directed by Gerry Fox. London's Somerset House presented a solo exhibition of Quinn in 2015, focusing on recent sculptures.

In 2017, Marc Quinn staged a major exhibition at the Sir John Soane's Museum in London. The exhibition was the first in a new series of collaborations with contemporary artists, designers, and architects, which, inspired by the spirit of Sir John Soane, sought to bring the collection to life in innovative ways.

== Works ==
Quinn's early work was concerned with issues of corporeality, decay, and preservation. He experimented with organic and degradable materials including bread, blood, lead, flowers and DNA producing sculpture and installation, including Bread Sculptures (1988), Self (1991), Emotional Detox (1995), Garden (2000), and DNA Portrait of John Sulston (2001). In the 2000s, he began to focus on the use of marble, bronze, and concrete. The artist explored the body and its extremes through the lens of classical and urban materials; works included The Complete Marbles (1999–2005), Alison Lapper Pregnant (2004), Evolution (2005–2009) and Planet (2008). Since 2010 he has worked with metals including stainless steel, aluminium, graffiti paints, seaside detritus, tapestry and painting, as seen in The History Paintings (2009–present) and The Toxic Sublime (2014–present).

== Early works: 1991–2000 ==
=== Self, 1991 – present ===
The first work of Quinn's to gain international fame was Self, which was exhibited in 1991, when he was 27. Self (1991) is a self-portrait formed by a frozen cast of 10 pints of the artist's blood. It is an ongoing work, where the artist portrays himself every five years through a new cast with new blood. The artworks are placed in transparent plexiglass-glass boxes, on top of freezing cabinets. The work is maintained in a refrigeration unit, and Quinn has described its dependence on electricity as reflecting his own dependence on alcohol when the first version was made.

Self (2006) is owned by the National Portrait Gallery, London.

=== Emotional Detox, 1995 ===
In 1995 Quinn produced Emotional Detox, a series of seven sculptures made of lead and cast from the artist's own body, were created at this time. Inspired by traditional iconography of the seven deadly sins, in each sculpture Quinn's body is being torn apart and reconfigured, reflecting detoxification as both a physical and psychological battle.

Emotional Detox has been exhibited at Tate Britain, London (1995), Groninger Museum, The Netherlands (2000), and Stedelijk Museum, Amsterdam (2015).

=== Garden (2000) ===
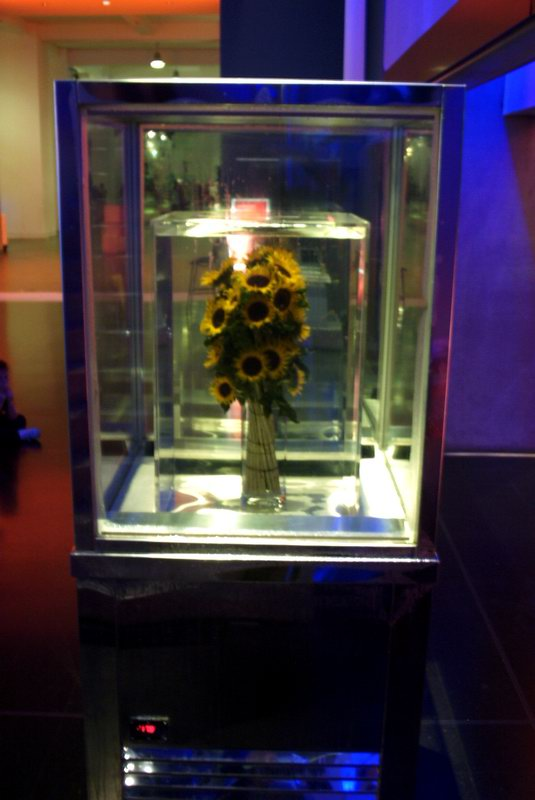
Eternal Spring – Sunflowers II, sunflowers kept chilled in liquid silicone oil

In 2000, Quinn was given a solo exhibition at the Fondazione Prada, Milan, which included his most ambitious works, involving organic matter. Garden is a 12-metre-long, 3-metre-high sculpture in which thousands of flowers are frozen in silicone oil. The work now belongs to the Fondazione Prada, in Milan.

== Notable works: 2000–2010 ==
=== Portrait of John E. Sulston (2001) ===
Quinn's portrait of John E. Sulston, who won the Nobel Prize in Physiology or Medicine in 2002 for sequencing the human genome on the Human Genome Project, is in the National Portrait Gallery. It consists of bacteria containing Sulston's DNA in agar jelly. "The portrait was made by our standard methods for DNA cloning", writes Sulston. "My DNA was broken randomly into segments, and treated so that they could be replicated in bacteria. The bacteria containing the DNA segments were spread out on agar jelly in the plate you see in the portrait."

=== Alison Lapper, The Fourth Plinth (2005–2007) ===
Quinn has made a series of marble sculptures of people either born with limbs missing or who have had them amputated. This culminated in his 15-ton marble statue of Alison Lapper, a fellow artist born with no arms and severely shortened legs, which was displayed on the fourth plinth in Trafalgar Square, London from September 2005 until October 2007. (The Fourth Plinth is used for rotating displays of sculpture.) In Disability Studies Quarterly, Ann Millett writes, "The work has been highly criticized for capitalizing on the shock value of disability, as well as lauded for its progressive social values. Alison Lapper Pregnant and the controversy surrounding it showcase disability issues at the forefront of current debates in contemporary art".

A large reproduction of the sculpture was used as a central element of the 2012 Summer Paralympics opening ceremony.

=== Sphinx (2006) and Siren (2008) ===
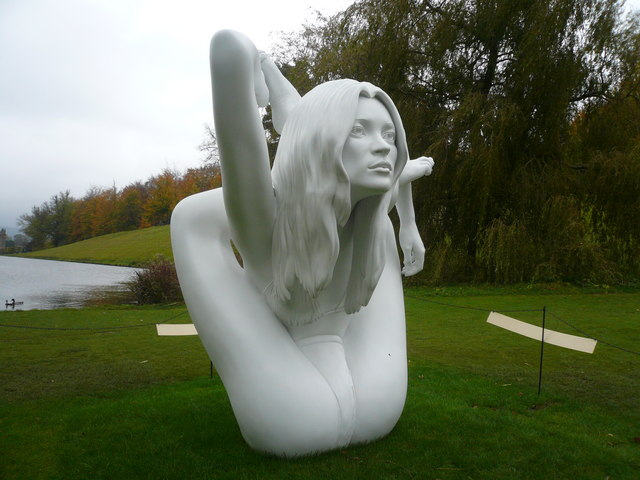
Myth (Sphinx), Chatsworth House

Since 2006, Marc Quinn has made numerous studies of the supermodel Kate Moss. In April 2006, Sphinx, a sculpture of Kate Moss by Quinn, was revealed. The sculpture shows Moss in a yoga position with her ankles and arms wrapped behind her ears. This body of work culminated in an exhibition at the Mary Boone Gallery in New York in May 2007. The sculpture is on permanent display in Folketeatret in Oslo, Norway.

In August 2008, Quinn unveiled another sculpture of Moss in solid 18-carat gold called Siren, which was exhibited at the British Museum in London. The life-size sculpture was promoted as "the largest gold statue since ancient Egypt".

=== History Paintings (2009 – present) ===
In 2009 Quinn began his "History Paintings" series which has continued to evolve. The initial group of work in this effort were of enlarged press photos of conflicts around the world rendered into oil on canvas paintings or silk or wool jacquard tapestries.

== Notable works: 2010 – present ==
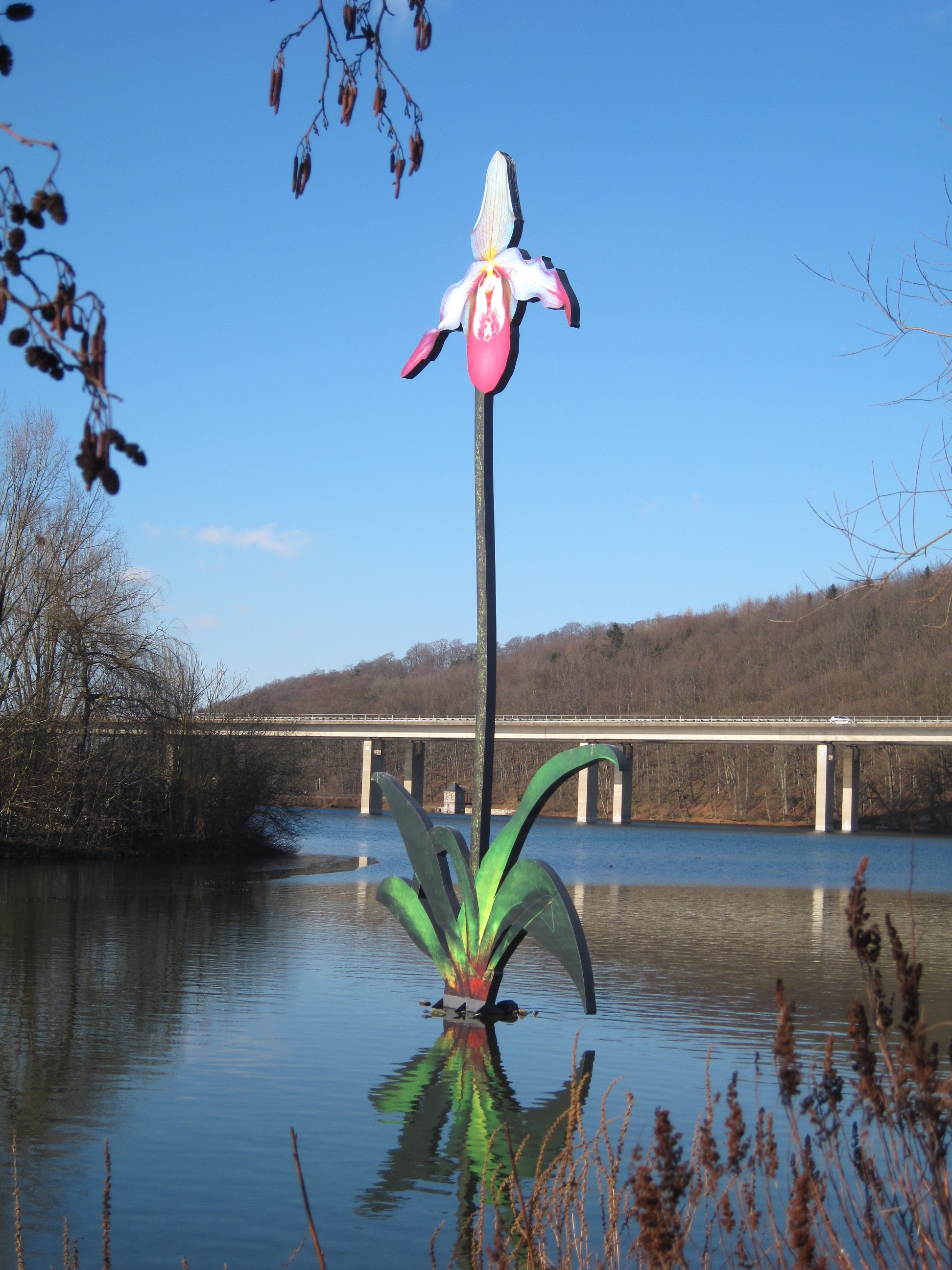
An orchid sculpture by Marc Quinn on the Seilersee in Iserlohn

In May 2010, Quinn revealed a series of new sculptures at London's White Cube gallery including The Ecstatic Autogenesis of Pamela based on film actress Pamela Anderson and Chelsea Charms based on pornography model Chelsea Charms.

Quinn's models have included "Catman" Dennis Avner (who has been tattooed to look like a cat) and transgender people such as Thomas Beatie, Buck Angel, and Allanah Starr. Quinn's portrait sculpture "Buck & Allanah" depicts the two nude, standing hand in hand, in a pose reminiscent of Adam and Eve. The sculpture of Thomas Beatie depicts him at full-term pregnancy, bowing his head and cradling his abdomen with two hands.

The exhibition also included a new series of flower paintings executed in reversed colour and two large-scale orchid sculptures in white painted bronze, installed in Hoxton Square, opposite the gallery.

=== The Toxic Sublime (2015) ===
In 2015 Marc Quinn opened an exhibition of new work at White Cube Bermondsey, entitled The Toxic Sublime. It featured new bodies of work that explore the ecological impact of man on nature. ‘The Toxic Sublimes’ are distorted, three dimensional seascapes. Alongside these paintings, a new series of sculptures, cast in stainless steel, including one measuring over 7.5 meters long, form part of a body of work titled Frozen Waves. The sculptures originate from the core of shells, eroded by the endless action of waves.

=== All About Love (2016–2017) ===
In 2017, Quinn was given a solo exhibition at Sir John Soane's Museum in London. A display of 12 life-cast sculptures, the All About Love series explore the notion of love through the expression of classical fragmented sculpture. Created in collaboration with his partner at the time, the sculptures, which depict the two embracing one another, are works that echo sculptures of many periods from the Renaissance to Auguste Rodin.

=== A Surge of Power (Jen Reid) 2020 ===
The sculpture A Surge of Power (Jen Reid) 2020 was erected secretly in Bristol in the early morning of 15 July 2020; it is Quinn's statue of Black Lives Matter protester, Jen Reid. The statue was mounted on the plinth which formerly held a 19th-century statue of Edward Colston, a Bristol merchant, philanthropist, and Tory Member of Parliament (MP) who had been involved in the Atlantic slave trade. Just over 24 hours after the statue was installed, the Bristol City Council had it taken down as it did not have permission to be installed. The Mayor of Bristol, Marvin Rees, invited Quinn to make a contribution towards the cost to the council of having his statue removed.

=== Viral Paintings (2020) ===
This currently ongoing series of paintings by Quinn are of paint splattered over blown up screen shots of photos and news stories of current events taken on his cell phone and created during and in response to the COVID-19 pandemic. These new works are considered a continuation of his History Painting series begun in 2009.

== Charity auctions ==
Quinn has participated in a number of charity auctions since 2010. His work was auctioned for the UK's homelessness charity, Crisis, in collaboration with Vogue at Christie's in 2010. In 2013, he donated work to the Mimi Foundation charity for cancer auction at Sotheby's. He donated work to the charity auction for Peace One Day at Bonhams, curated by Jake Chapman, in 2014 and 2015.

In 2013 Quinn was commissioned to make a work for RHS Chelsea Flower Show, marking the first time an artist collaborated with the flower show in its 100-year history. The Rush of Nature (2013) was auctioned at Sotheby’s to help raise money for RHS Chelsea Centenary Appeal.

Work by Quinn was auctioned at the Leonardo DiCaprio Foundation annual St. Tropez Gala in 2016, supporting environmental protection.

== Art market ==
The most expensive work by the artist in the art market was Myth Venus (2006), a sculpture of model Kate Moss, sold by $1,325,000 at Christie's New York, on 14 March 2014.

== Public collections ==
The work of the artist is held, among others, in the following public collections:

- Astrup Fearnley Museum of Modern Art, Oslo
- Berardo Collection Museum, Lisbon
- Metropolitan Museum of Art, New York.
- Musée d'art contemporain de Montréal
- Musée National d'Art Moderne, Paris
- Museum of Modern Art, New York
- National Portrait Gallery, London
- Stedelijk Museum, Amsterdam
- Tate Modern, London
