= Julian Farino =

English film and television producer and director

- Born: 9 April 1961 (age 65); London, England
- Occupations: Television director, television producer, film director.
- Spouse: Branka Katić

Julian Farino (born 9 April 1961) is an English film and television producer and director. He directed much of the first three seasons of the HBO series Entourage.

== Career ==
Farino was born and raised in London and educated at Cambridge University. He became an editor of The Guinness Book of Records after graduating, and later appeared as a co-presenter on Record Breakers alongside Fiona Kennedy and Roy Castle.

After a period as a television researcher at Granada Television, he began his directing career there making a sequence of observational films about drag queens, young classical musicians, children's entertainers, and boxers. They Call Us Nutters was a portrait of life on a ward of Ashworth Maximum Security Hospital, and A Winter's Tale described life in the coldest inhabited place on earth, Oymyakon in Eastern Siberia.

In 2000 he directed 7Up 2000, a continuation of the multi-award-winning documentary series, featuring 7-year-olds from all over Britain - a project that continued with 14 Up in 2007. His film drama in the UK includes an adaptation of Charles Dickens's Our Mutual Friend, which won four BAFTAs including Best Drama; Bob and Rose, a romantic comedy which won Best Series at The British Comedy Awards; and Flesh and Blood, starring Christopher Eccleston, which won the Prix Europa for Best Film. Other credits in the UK include The Last Yellow for BBC Films starring Samantha Morton and Mark Addy, and Byron, a biopic of the romantic poet, starring Jonny Lee Miller and Vanessa Redgrave.

Farino went to the United States in 2004 to work for HBO, and directed the majority of episodes of the first three seasons of Entourage. He stayed to work on the series Big Love and Rome, and has received four Emmy and three DGA nominations.' He was executive producer and director of the HBO television show How to Make It in America for its two series. For Entourage: The Sundance Kids he was nominated in category Best Directing for a Comedy. In 2010, Farino directed The Oranges starring Hugh Laurie and Leighton Meester, his first feature film in the US. The movie premiered at the Toronto International Film Festival and was released on 5 October 2012.

== Personal life ==
Previously based in Los Angeles, Farino lives in England with his wife, actress Branka Katić and their two sons, Louis and Joe.

== Filmography ==
=== Television ===
Year	Title	Notes
1992–94	Coronation Street	37 episodes
1994–96	In Suspicious Circumstances	4 episodes
1995	Medics	2 episodes
1996	Out of the Blue	2 episodes
1996	Savage Skies	Segment "The Winter's Tale"
1997	Wokenwell	4 episodes
1998	Our Mutual Friend	4 episodes
2000	7 Up 2000	
2001	Bob & Rose	
2004–09	Entourage	23 episodes
2004	Sex and the City	2 episodes
2005	Rome	1 episode
2006–07	Big Love	3 episodes
2007	14 Up 2000	
2007	The Office	2 episodes
2010	How to Make It in America	
2013	The Newsroom	Episode "One Step Too Many"
2013	Hello Ladies	2 episodes
2014	Brooklyn Nine-Nine	Episode "The Bet"
2014	21 Up New Generation	
2015–2018	Ballers	17 episodes
2019	Giri/Haji	5 episodes
2021	In Treatment	4 episodes
2021	28 Up: Millennium Generation	
2023	Florida Man	2 episodes
2025	Amadeus	3 episodes
2026	Black Doves	4 episodes

=== Film ===
Year	Title	Notes
1999	The Last Yellow	
2002	Flesh and Blood	
2003	Byron	
2011	The Oranges	
2014	Marvellous	Winner of the BAFTA Television Craft Award for Best Director
2017	The Child in Time	
2024	The Union	
