= Liliana Brisby =

British broadcaster and editor (1923–1998)

Rada Liliana Brisby (née Daneva; 2 February 1923 – 30 October 1998) was a Bulgarian-born British broadcaster, writer, editor, and concert pianist.

She was born in Sofia on 2 February 1923, the daughter of a diplomat father and a concert pianist mother. Her paternal grandfather, Stoyan Danev was Prime Minister and Foreign Minister of Bulgaria before the First World War, and her great-grandfather was the first Prime Minister of Bulgaria.

Brisby was editor of The World Today, the monthly journal of the Royal Institute of International Affairs, from 1975 until her retirement in 1983.

== Selected publications ==
- Markov, Georgi (1984). The Truth That Killed. Translated by Brisby, Liliana. New York: Ticknor & Fields. ISBN 978-0-89919-296-3 – via Internet Archive.
- Keep, John; Brisby, Liliana, eds. (1964). Contemporary History in the Soviet Mirror (PDF). New York and London: Frederick A. Praeger – via Internet Archive.
