= Diana: In Her Own Words =

2017 British documentary film

Diana: In Her Own Words is a television documentary that was broadcast on Channel 4 in the United Kingdom on 6 August 2017. This film was produced by Kaboom Film and Television of the United Kingdom. The film includes footage of the late Diana, Princess of Wales discussing aspects of her personal life, including her marriage to Prince Charles which was recorded during conversations she had with a voice coach in 1992 and 1993.

In July 2017, it emerged that Channel 4 planned to broadcast the documentary in the run up to the 20th anniversary of the death of Diana. On 30 July, The Mail on Sunday reported that Diana's brother, the 9th Earl Spencer, had urged Channel 4 not to broadcast the tapes of his sister amid concerns it would cause distress to her two sons. His concerns were subsequently echoed by Royal commentators and friends of the late princess, including Rosa Monckton, who intended to write to the broadcaster urging them not to show the footage, which she said "doesn't belong in the public domain".

The documentary drew a mixed reaction from critics, as well as giving Channel 4 their largest overnight ratings for over a year. Figures indicated the film was watched by an average audience of 3.5 million, peaking at 4.1 million.

The documentary aired on PBS in the United States in a slightly altered form, under the title Diana—Her Story.

A National Geographic documentary with the identical title, "Diana: In Her Own Words," was released the same year and was also structured around previously unaired interviews, but is unrelated. That documentary, by filmmakers Tom Jennings and David Tillman, used interviews from 1991 which had originally been recorded for the Andrew Morton biography, Diana: Her True Story.
