= Mouth and foot painting =

Technique to create drawings, paintings, and other works of art

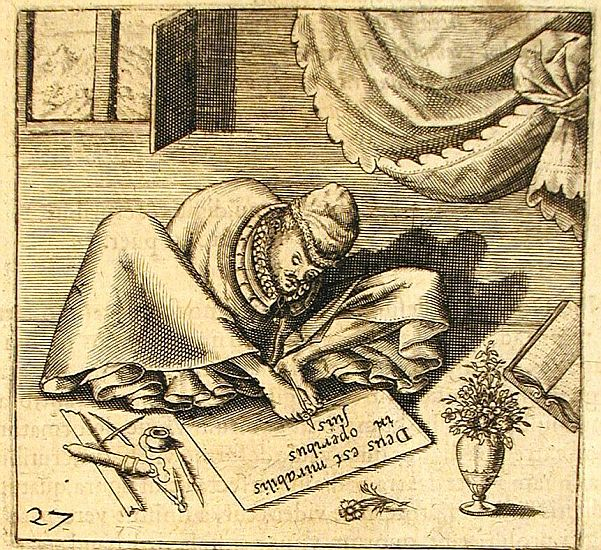
Self portrait by mouth and foot artist Thomas Schweicker (1540–1602)

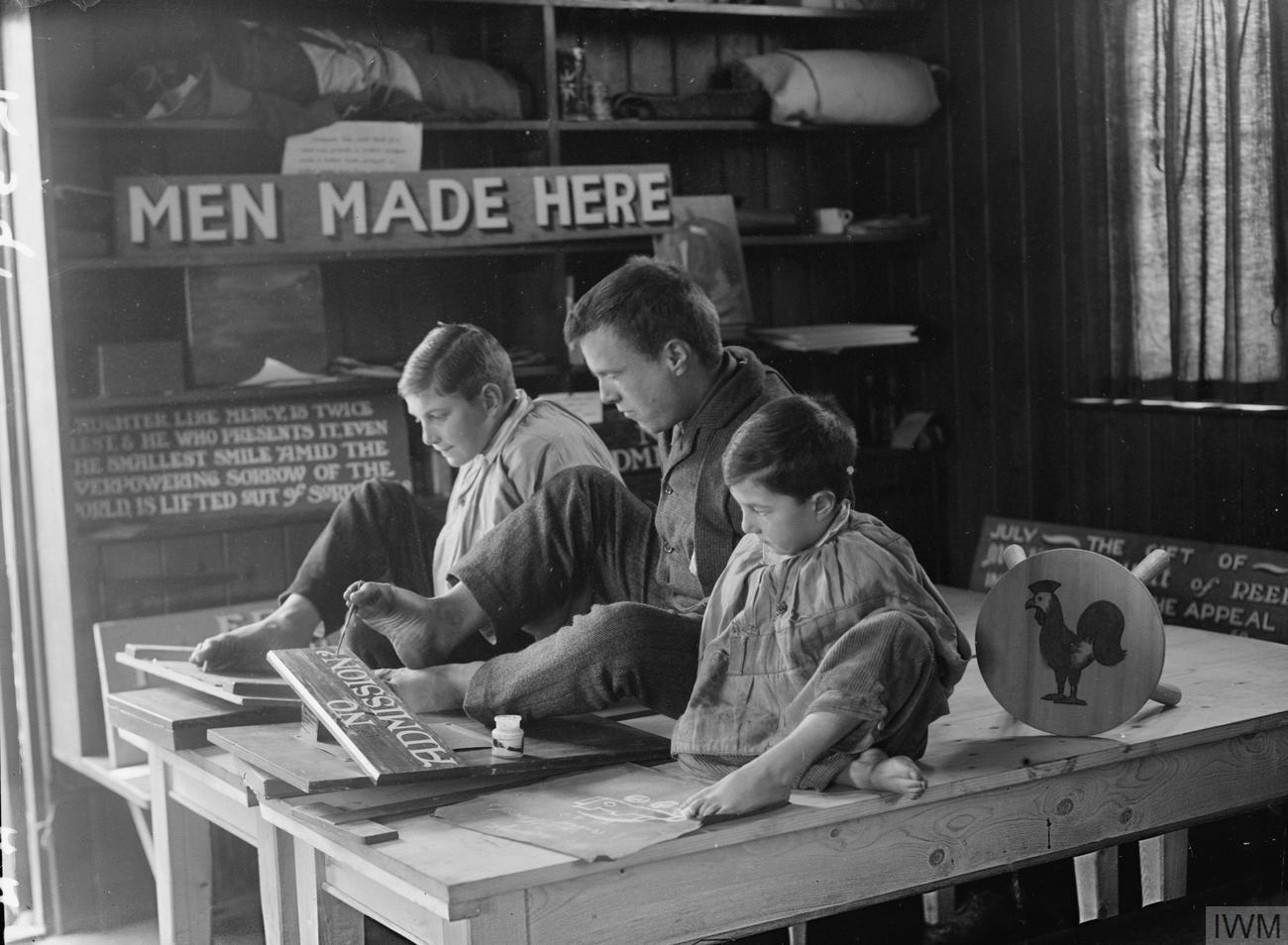
Disabled boys being taught to paint and write with their feet during World War I

Mouth and foot painting is a technique to create drawings, paintings and other works of art by maneuvering brushes and other tools with the mouth or foot. The technique is mostly used by artists who through illness, accident, or congenital disability have no use of their hands. The Association of Mouth and Foot Painting Artists (AMFPA) is a worldwide organization representing these artists.

The brushes and tools that are used are ordinary artist's implements, but they may be modified in length or width. Mouth painters hold the brush in their mouth or between their teeth and maneuver it with their tongue and cheek muscles. The paper or canvas is usually mounted vertically on an easel. Mouth painting is strenuous for neck and jaw muscles since the head has to perform the same back and forth movement as a hand does when painting. Foot painting can be done sitting on the floor, at a table or at an easel, as most foot painters use their toes with the same dexterity as people with hands use their fingers, this also helps the brush manoeuvre its self making it be more free with its art.

== Notable mouth and foot painters ==
- Simona Atzori
- Earl Bailly
- Sarah Biffen
- Lorenza Böttner
- Matthias Buchinger
- John Carter
- Louis Joseph César Ducornet
- Janarthanan Kesavan
- Alison Lapper
- Mariam Paré
- Edward Rainey
- Thomas Schweicker
- Steven L. Sles
- Arnulf Erich Stegmann
- Charles B. Tripp
- Brom Wikstrom
- Denise Legrix
