= Phocomelia =

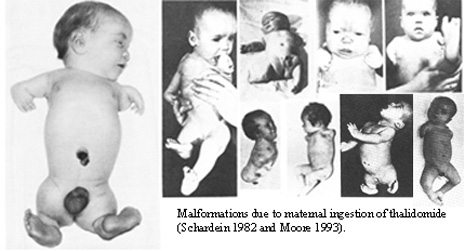
- Cases of severe thalidomide-induced phocomelia
- Specialty: Teratology

Phocomelia is a congenital disorder that involves malformations of human arms and legs that result in a flipper-like appendage. A prominent cause of phocomelia is the mother being prescribed the use of the drug thalidomide during pregnancy; however, the causes of most cases are to be determined.

Occurrence in an individual results in various abnormalities to the face, limbs, ears, nose, vessels and many other underdevelopments. Although operations may improve some abnormalities, many are not surgically treatable due to the lack of nerves and other related structures.

The term is from Ancient Greek φώκη phōkē, "seal (animal)" + -o- interfix + μέλος melos, "limb" + ια -ia suffix). Phocomelia is an extremely rare congenital disorder involving malformation of the limbs (dysmelia). Étienne Geoffroy Saint-Hilaire coined the term in 1836.

== Signs and symptoms ==
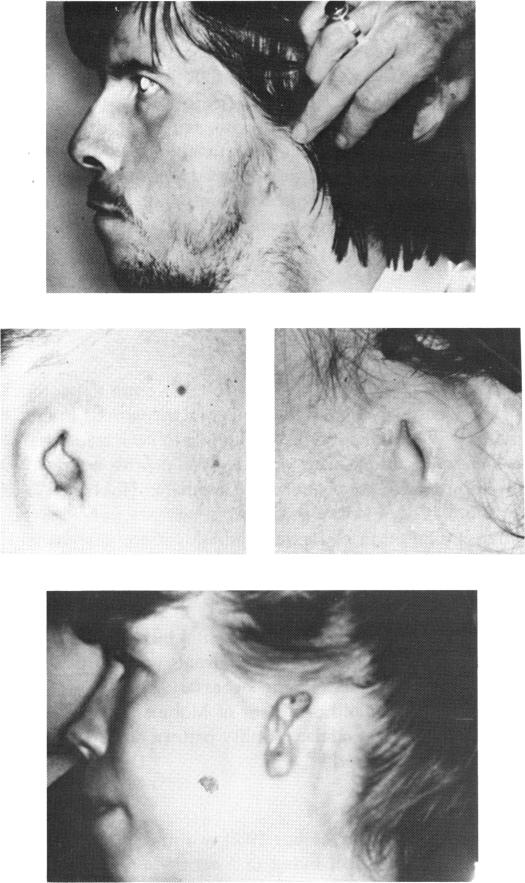
Phocomelia manifested as auricular abnormalities

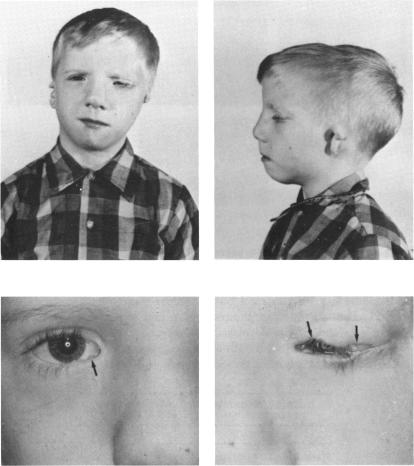
Eyesight limitation from phocomelia

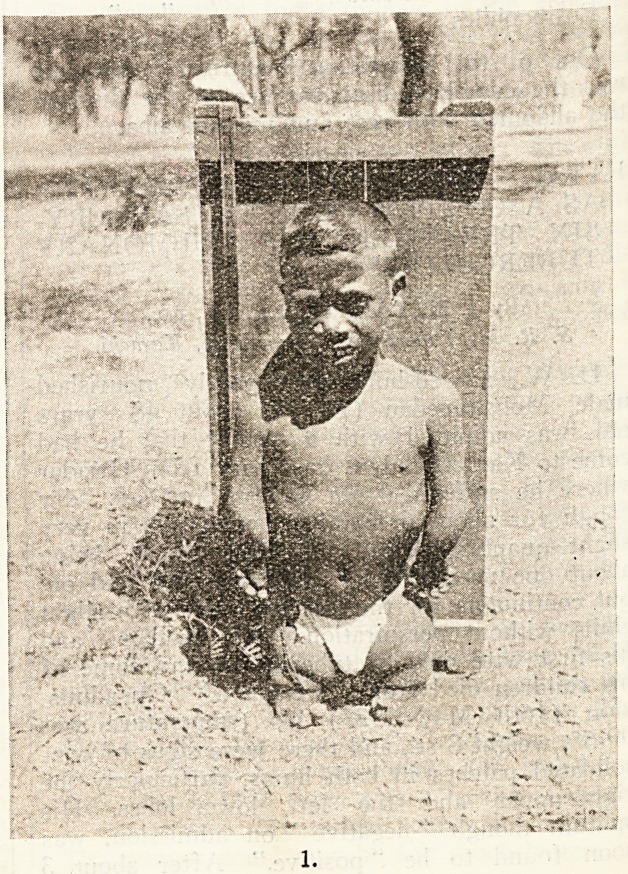
9-year-old Indian boy with phocomelia affecting both arms and legs, 1928

The symptoms of phocomelia syndrome are undeveloped limbs and absent pelvic bones; however, various abnormalities can occur to the limbs and bones. Usually the upper limbs are not fully formed and sections of the "hands and arms may be missing". Short arm bones, fused fingers, and missing thumbs will often occur. Sometimes hands or fingers will be present but limp due to having no bones or being loosely attached. Legs and feet are also affected similarly to the arms and hands. Individuals with phocomelia will often lack thigh bones, and the hands or feet may be abnormally small or appear as stumps due to their close "attachment to the body".

According to National Organization for Rare Disorders (NORD), individuals carrying phocomelia syndrome will generally show symptoms of growth retardation previous to and after birth. The syndrome can also cause severe mental deficiencies in infants. Infants born with phocomelia will normally have a petite head with "sparse hair" that may appear "silvery-blonde". Hemangioma, the abnormal buildup of blood vessels, will possibly develop around the facial area at birth and the eyes may be set widely apart, a condition known as orbital hypertelorism. The pigment of the eyes will be a bluish white. Phocomelia can also cause: an undeveloped nose with slender nostrils, disfigured ears, irregularly petite jaws (a condition known as micrognathia), and a cleft lip with cleft palate. According to NORD, severe symptoms of phocomelia include:

- A fissure of the skull and a projecting brain known as encephalocele
- An accumulation of spinal fluid under the skull also known as hydrocephalus, causing vomiting and migraines
- An abnormally shaped uterus (bicornuate)
- Inability to clot blood efficiently due to a low amount of platelets running through the blood
- Malformations in the kidney and heart
- Shortened neck
- Abnormalities in the urethra

=== Thalidomide syndrome symptoms ===
When an individual is born with phocomelia due to drugs or pharmaceuticals, it is known as thalidomide syndrome. The symptoms of thalidomide syndrome are defined by absent or shortened limbs, causing flipper hands and feet. According to Anthony J Perri III and Sylvia Hsu they can additionally receive:

- Palsy disorder of the face
- Ear and eye abnormalities, resulting in limited/complete loss of hearing or sight
- Gastrointestinal and genitourinary tract disorders
- Ingrown genitalia
- Undeveloped/missing lungs
- Distorted digestive tract, heart, kidney
- Hypoplastic or absent bones

The infants that were exposed to thalidomide during development phases had a 40% chance of survival. The McCredie–McBride hypothesis explains that the limbs of the infants become malformed as a result of the thalidomide harming the neural tissue—simply because the neural tissue has such a large impact on formation and development of the limbs.

== Causes ==
=== Thalidomide ===
Thalidomide was released onto the market in 1958 in West Germany under the name Contergan. Primarily prescribed as a sedative or hypnotic, thalidomide also claimed to cure "anxiety, insomnia, gastritis, and tension". Afterwards it was used against nausea and to alleviate morning sickness in pregnant women. Thalidomide became an over-the-counter drug in Germany around 1960, i.e. it could be bought without a prescription. Shortly after the drug was sold, in Germany between 5,000 and 7,000 infants were born with phocomelia. Only 40% of these children survived.

Research also proves that although phocomelia did exist through the 1940s and 1950s, cases of severe phocomelia multiplied in the 1960s when thalidomide was released in Germany; the direct cause was traced to thalidomide. The statistic was given that "50 percent of the mothers with deformed children had taken thalidomide during the first trimester of pregnancy." Throughout Europe, Australia, and the United States, 10,000 cases were reported of infants with phocomelia; only 50% of the 10,000 survived. Thalidomide became effectively linked to death or severe disabilities among babies. Those subjected to thalidomide while in the womb experienced limb deficiencies in that the long limbs either were not developed or presented themselves as stumps. Other effects included deformed eyes, hearts, alimentary and urinary tracts, blindness and deafness.

=== Genetic inheritance ===
According to the National Organization for Rare Disorders (NORD), when phocomelia is transmitted (in its familial genetic form) it is seen as an autosomal recessive trait and the mutation is linked to chromosome 8.

A study of Roberts syndrome, a genetic disorder showing similar symptoms to phocomelia, has shed light on the possible causes. An individual afflicted with Roberts syndrome will have chromosome copies that do not connect at the centromeres, making them unable to line up accordingly. As a result, the newly made cells contain an excess or reduced number of chromosomes. In both Roberts syndrome and phocomelia the cells cease to develop, or die, preventing proper development of the limbs, eyes, brain, palate, or other structures.

== Treatment ==
Prosthesis is a synthetic alternative for missing limbs, teeth, and various other body parts. Advances in materials, pigments and manufacturing methods during the twentieth century have rendered artificial limbs lighter in weight and more realistic-looking. Myoelectric prostheses take all their input from the nervous system and muscles at the site of attachment in the form of electric signals.

Children born with phocomelia are recommended to have a prosthetic mitten fitted to get used to the sensation of wearing an aid early on; typically a hook is added around the age of two years until the necessary tissues, bone structures, proprioception and motor coordination have developed to permit use of a myoelectric prosthetic limb.

== Notable people with phocomelia ==
- Gabriel Araújo (born 2002) is a Brazilian paralympic swimmer. Nicknamed "rocketman", he has won numerous world events including five Paralympic gold medals.
- Sarah Biffen (c. 1784–1850) was an English painter born without arms and only vestigial legs. She learned to paint by mouth, was taught by William Craig, and exhibited at the Royal Academy. Biffen was commissioned to paint miniatures of the British royal family, and Queen Victoria later awarded her a pension.
- Eli Bowen (1844–1924), who made his living performing in sideshows.
- Matthias Buchinger (1674–1740) was born without hands or legs and was an artist and performer who travelled across Northern Europe. Buchinger was an incredibly accomplished micro-engraver, magician, marksman and musician. He was married 4 times and had 14 children.
- Sheetal Devi (born 2007), born in India, is the first and only armless para-archer to reach world number one in compound women's para-archery ranking.
- Louis Joseph César Ducornet (1806–1856) was a French painter who painted with his foot. He is known primarily for biblical and historical scenes, as well as portraits.
- Mat Fraser (born 1962) was born with phocomelia due to his mother taking thalidomide while she was pregnant. He is known as the drummer of rock bands including Fear of Sex, The Reasonable Strollers, Joyride, the Grateful Dub, and Living in Texas. He is also an actor and performing artist.
- Rahma Haruna (c. 1996–2016) was born in Nigeria with severe phocomelia. She had no limbs, except for a partially formed right hand that was attached to her axilla. Rahma's story came out when a local journalist saw her on the street with her brother, after which the story was shared widely on social media. She died at the age of 19, on 25 December 2016.
- Alison Lapper (born 1965) was born in England with phocomelia. She is arm deficient and has shortened bones and legs. Lapper graduated from Brighton University in 1994, established herself as a visual artist, and in 2000 gave birth to a son, Parys. Lapper produces cards and calendars for The Mouth and Foot Painters' Association. She does not wear prosthetic limbs.
- Hee Ah Lee (born 1985), a South Korean pianist who has two fingers on each hand.
- Thomas Quasthoff (born 1959), a German Lieder and opera singer.
- Enos Stutsman (1826–1874), Pioneer settler of North Dakota. Namesake of Stutsman County.
- Ronan Tynan (born 1964) was born in Ireland with phocomelia. He became a track and field athlete, competing in the 1984 and 1988 Summer Paralympics. Tynan went on to a career as a physician, and later, a singer.
