= Steven L. Sles =

American painter

Steven L. Sles (born June 16, 1940) is an American contemporary artist, composer and musician. He was born with cerebral palsy and was a scholar of Hans Hofmann, founder of Abstract Expressionism.

Sles is an established mouth painter; he is most recognized for his variations of techniques and fiery abstract palette.

== Biography ==
Sles was born into a Conservative Jewish family in New Jersey. His father co-founded the United Cerebral Palsy Society. Despite the advice of high school guidance counselors, who advised him that his handicap would probably make college attendance impossible, Sles attended Bard College and graduated from Swarthmore College in 1962.

After graduation, Sles became a working artist, painting in New York, Martinique, Paris and Cannes. He established a studio in Valencia, Spain.

=== Personal life ===
Sles was married for 22 years and raised a daughter. As an adult, he became an "unconventional modern Hasidic Jew" turning to Jewish mysticism and alternative healing techniques to help him transcend his disability.

== See also ==
- AMFPA
- MFPA
