= Janarthanan =

Janarthanan may refer to:

- Kadambur R. Janarthanan Indian union minister
- Janarthanan Kesavan Indian Mouth painter
