= Charles Tripp =

Charles Tripp may refer to:

- Charles B. Tripp (1855–1930), Canadian-American sideshow performer, known as the "Armless Wonder"
- Charles Tripp (runholder) (1826–1897), New Zealand sheep farmer
- Charles Nelson Tripp (1823–1866), Canadian-American geologist, early bitumen/oil producer
- Charles R. H. Tripp, British academic who specializes in the Near East and Middle East
