= Sarah Biffin =

English painter (1784–1850)

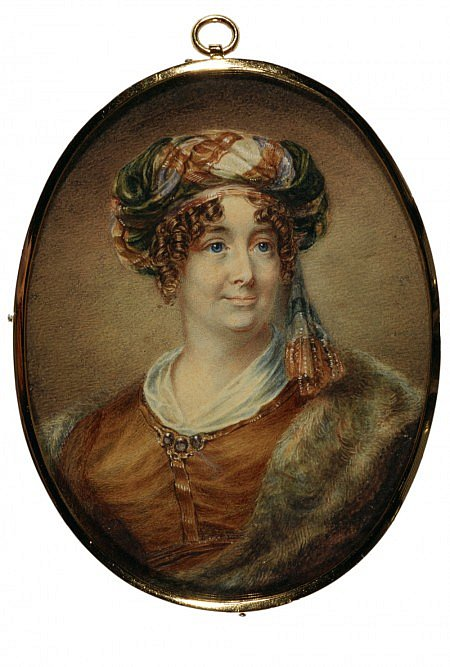
- Sarah Biffin's self-portrait, 1830
- Born: 25 October 1784; East Quantoxhead, Somerset, England
- Died: 2 October 1850 (aged 65); Liverpool, England
- Resting place: St James Cemetery, Liverpool
- Other names: Sarah Biffin; Sarah Beffin; Mrs E. M. Wright
- Known for: Painting
- Style: Mouth and foot painting
- Spouse: William Stephen Wright (m. 1824)
- Patrons: George Douglas, the Earl of Morton

Sarah Biffin (25 October 1784 – 2 October 1850), also known as Sarah Biffen, Sarah Beffin or by her married name Mrs E. M. Wright, was an English painter born in Somerset.

Biffin was born with phocomelia and had no arms and only vestigial legs, instead using her mouth to write, paint, and complete other tasks requiring implements.

She was apprenticed to a man named Emmanuel Dukes, who exhibited her as an attraction throughout England. In the St. Bartholomew's Fair of 1808, she came to the attention of George Douglas, the Earl of Morton, who went on to sponsor her to receive lessons from a Royal Academy of Arts painter, William Craig. The Society of Arts awarded her a medal in 1821 for a historical miniature and the Royal Academy accepted her paintings. The Royal Family commissioned her to paint miniature portraits of them.

When the Earl of Morton died in 1827, Biffin was left without a noble sponsor and she ran into financial trouble. Queen Victoria awarded her a Civil List pension and she retired to a private life in Liverpool.

== Early life ==
Sarah Biffin was born on 25 October 1784 in East Quantoxhead, Somerset, to Henry Biffin, a shoemaker, and his wife Sarah. She was the youngest of five children and grew up in a farmworker's cottage on the outskirts of the village.

Biffin was born with phocomelia, a rare congenital condition that left her without arms and with only vestigial legs. As an adult, she stood 37 inches (94 cm) tall. Despite her disability, she learned to read as a child and later learned to write using her mouth. As she grew older, she adapted to using her mouth to hold writing, drawing and sewing implements.

== Career ==
=== Sideshow career ===
At about the age of 13, in around 1797, Sarah Biffin entered into an apprenticeship with the travelling showman Emmanuel Dukes, who exhibited her at fairs and public entertainments throughout England. Although earlier accounts claimed that she had been "sold" or "given away" by her parents, recent archival research has found no evidence to support those claims. Instead, surviving records indicate that her relationship with Dukes was governed by a formal apprenticeship.

Throughout her teenage years and into her twenties, Biffin travelled extensively with Dukes, appearing at fairs and exhibitions across England. Dukes advertised her as the "Eighth Wonder", and audiences watched her write, draw, paint, and sew using her mouth and shoulder. Visitors paid an admission fee to watch her work and could also purchase examples of her handwriting, artwork and needlework.

At the age of 23, in 1808, Biffin appeared at Bartholomew Fair in London, where she was exhibited from a showman's caravan decorated with the image of a mermaid. During the fair, George Douglas, the Earl of Morton attended several sittings, removing an unfinished miniature between each session so that no one else could alter it before returning it for Biffin to continue. Satisfied that she had completed the work entirely unaided, he became her patron and later arranged for her to study under William Marshall Craig.

During her apprenticeship, Biffin's portrait miniatures sold for three guineas each, although later accounts suggested that she may have received as little as £5 a year from her work with Dukes. By about 1817, when she was in her early thirties, she left Dukes's employment under the patronage of the Earl of Morton.

=== Art career ===
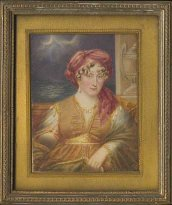
A portrait by Sarah Biffin

Supported by Morton, she opened a studio on the Strand in London and began accepting portrait commissions. During her career, she painted for King George III, King George IV, King William IV and Queen Victoria. She also travelled to Brussels with Morton, where she received commissions from the royal court.

At about the age of 36, in 1821, the Society of Arts awarded Biffin a medal for a historical miniature. Her paintings were also accepted for exhibition by the Royal Academy of Arts, where she continued to exhibit during the 1820s and early 1830s. Her surviving works include portrait miniatures, landscapes, still lifes and self-portraits, many of them signed "Without Hands".

Biffin also taught miniature painting, particularly to female students. Recent archival research has emphasized her self-portraits, letters and writings as evidence of how she represented herself as an artist. According to Ellie Smith, who worked on the 2022 exhibition Without Hands: The Art of Sarah Biffin, Biffin's self-portraits show how she "took control of her own image" and presented herself as a professional artist.

After Morton's death in 1827, when Biffin was about 42 years old, her financial circumstances became more difficult. She continued painting and exhibiting under her married name, Mrs E. M. Wright. In 1841, at the age of 56, she settled in Liverpool, where she established a new studio and resumed signing her work as "Miss Biffin". In her later years, she was supported by a Civil List pension from Queen Victoria and by a public subscription organised by supporters in Liverpool, including Richard Rathbone and Jenny Lind.

== Marriage and relationships ==
At the age of 39, on 6 September 1824, Biffin married William Stephen Wright, a banker's clerk. Contemporary accounts indicate that Wright had "long been attached" to Biffin before their marriage. Following the wedding, Biffin temporarily paused her painting career and began exhibiting under her married name, "Mrs E. M. Wright".

The marriage proved short-lived, and the couple separated within a few years. Despite the separation, Wright retained control of the money Biffin had earned and provided her with an annual allowance of £40. (Note: About £3,800 in 2025, indexed to prices rather than earnings.) During the late 1820s and early 1830s, Biffin resumed her artistic career and continued exhibiting at the Royal Academy under her married name. After settling in Liverpool in north-west England in 1841, at the age of 56, she returned to signing her work as "Miss Biffin".

== Death ==
Sarah Biffin died on 2 October 1850 at the age of 65. She is buried in St James Cemetery in Liverpool, though her gravestone no longer exists.

== Legacy ==
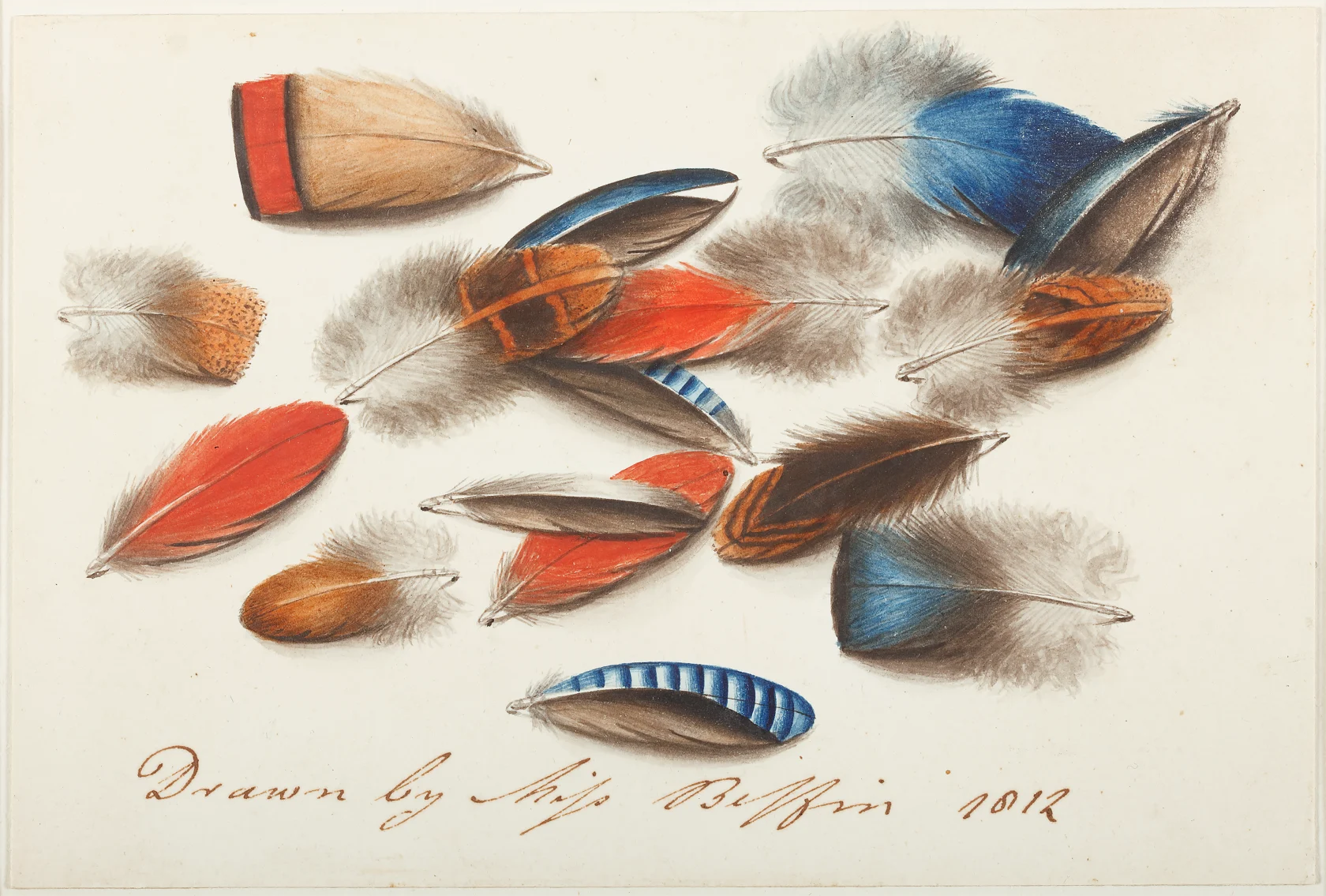
A Study of Feathers (1812)

According to Mouth and Foot Painting Artists, Biffin was the first recorded British mouth painter. A self-portrait engraved by RW Sievier and published in London in June 1821 was sold at Sotheby’s in 1986 and again at Sotheby’s on 5 December 2019. The sale was of the collection of the late Dr Erika Pohl-Ströher. The auction estimate was £800–£1200 but the final sale price was £137,500.

The first exhibition of Biffin’s work for 100 years Without Hands: the Art of Sarah Biffin, was held at the galleries of Philip Mould & Company, London in 2022.

In February 2024, BBC news reported that the Museum of Somerset in Taunton, which holds a large collection of Sarah Biffin's work, had acquired a self-portrait by the artist. A watercolour by Biffin dated circa 1812 is located in the Welcome Collection in Euston Road, London. Additional works can be found at the National Portrait Gallery, London.

== See also ==
- John Carter (mouth artist) (1815–1850), who was paralysed from below the neck after a fall.
- Mouth and foot painting – Technique to create drawings, paintings, and other works of art
