= Marcel Sendrail =

French physician (1900–1976)

Marcel Sendrail (born in Toulouse 31 August 1900 - 4 June 1976) was a French physician and writer.

== Biography ==
Marcel Sendrail comes from a line of Languedoc farmers. His father became Director of the Toulouse Veterinary School. An intern in 1921, doctor of medicine in 1925, associate of the faculty of medicine in 1930. He taught general pathology and experimental medicine at the Faculty of Toulouse until 1971. After completing a thesis in experimental oncology, he turned his attention to endocrinology. Having carried out a number of experimental studies on diabetes, he was called upon from 1942 to 1946 to head the Regional Insulin Centre, which distributed the little insulin then available in the South-West counties.

In parallel with his experimental research (more than six hundred publications), Marcel Sendrail reflected on medical practice as a humanist. In his personal work and in the theses he inspired, he was particularly interested in the history of medicine, and took a medical look at the works of recent writers (Rilke, Paul Valéry...). A popular lecturer with the Toulouse public, he was an early member of the city's academies and learned societies, particularly the Académie des Jeux Floraux, of which he was principal for thirty-three years and perpetual secretary for 18 years.

== Views and opinions ==
Against a scientific and technical conception, Marcel Sendrail defended a humanistic approach to medicine, in which he saw an instrument of culture and a source of wisdom. Against standardization, he emphasized the principle of individualization in biology. He gave a central place to illness, through which individuality is expressed.

His work as a medical historian takes the form of:

1. biographical essays on medical figures from Hippocrates to Laennec, found in prefaces or, above all, in the chapters of Le Serpent et le Miroir and Sages et Mages.
2. great survey to which he devoted his last years and which remained unfinished, Histoire culturelle de la maladie, a book which presents not the physician's point of view and the progress of medicine, but the context in which the illnesses that characterize the culture of each century appear and disappear.

Finally, his most accomplished work, Sagesse et délire des formes, takes a doctor's look at the meaning of forms created by nature or art.

== Works ==
- Ambroise Paré, textes choisis, présentés et commentés. Les Belles lettres, collection des Universités de France, Paris, 1953.
- Le Serpent et le miroir, collection l'Épi, Plon, Paris, 1954. Preface by Raymond Escholier International Lecomte du Nouy Prize 1954
- Sagesse et délire des formes, Hachette, Paris, 1967 (One volume of 252 pages with 16 plates and 15 figures) Grand prix du Rayonnement français (Académie française, 1968) Prix Littré (Groupement des écrivains médecins, 1968)
- Sages et mages: le savoir et les secrets de la vie, collection "Le corps et l'esprit", Hachette, Paris, 1971.
- Solitude trahie, collection Anima, Privat, 1973.
- La Vie attentive, Privat, 1978. Preface by Philippe Wolff.
- Histoire culturelle de la maladie, Privat, 1980 (Work completed by nine contributors). One bound volume, 458 pages, 40 hors-texte plates). Reissued in 1981 in a paperback edition without hors-texte.

== Bibliography ==
- "Hommage à Marcel Sendrail, historien de la médecine", in Cahiers du centre d'étude d'histoire de la médecine, December 1996.

Contains an interesting anthology of some of his works.

- Cyrille Montesinos, Formation et pratique médicale dans l'œuvre de Marcel Sendrail, doctoral thesis in medicine, Toulouse, 1997
- "Hommage à Marcel Sendrail", in Cahiers de l'Hôtel d'Assézat, Toulouse, 1998

Six papers dealing with various aspects of Marcel Sendrail's personality and work.

- Doctor André Soubiran pays tribute to him in Volume 2 of Les hommes en blanc.
