= Atzori =

Atzori is an Italian surname. Notable people with the surname include:

- Fernando Atzori (1942–2020), Italian flyweight boxer
- Gianluca Atzori (born 1971), Italian football player and manager
- Simona Atzori (born 1974), Italian artist and dancer
