= John Carter (mouth artist) =

English painter

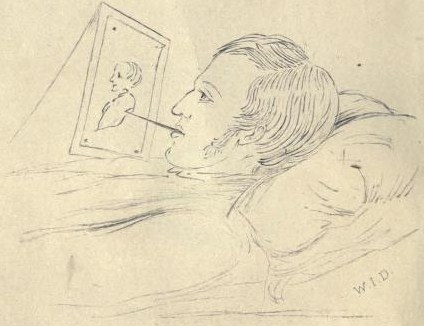
John Carter at work (engraved by W. Holl after W. J. Dampier, vicar of Coggeshall)

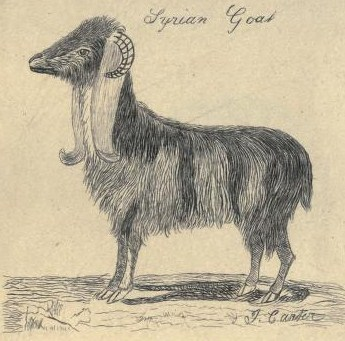
"Syrian goat" – Carter's first work of line art (engraved by W. Holl)

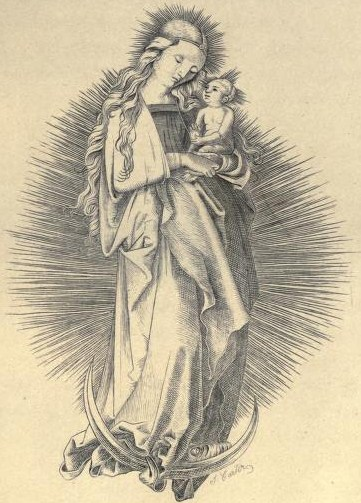
Virgin and child (after A. Dürer)

John Carter (31 July 1815 – 4 June 1850) was an English silk weaver and mouth artist. After an accident left him paralysed from below the neck, he learnt to draw, paint, and write by holding the pencil, pen or brush in his mouth. His outstanding ability drew much public interest; with accounts of his life and favourable reviews of his work appearing in the press both at home in the United Kingdom, the United States and elsewhere.

== Life ==
Carter, a silk-weaver by trade, was born of humble parents at Coggeshall, in the county of Essex, on 31 July 1815. He attended the local infants' school in Church Street in the town, followed by the Parish National School, then, at the age of 13, the local endowed school (founded by Sir Robert Hitcham in 1636), where he remained for two years. Although he had no obvious skill for drawing as a boy, he admitted that "Whenever I had a pen or pencil in my hand, I was sure to be drawing in my books or on my slate, and at home about the walls of the house"; however, this propensity was not developed any further and an artistic career was not considered.

On leaving school, Carter was apprenticed to silk-weaver Charles Beckwith, and, after his marriage to Lucy (d. Nov. 1841) in 1835, pursued the business on his own account. However, he fell into bad company and spent much of his time drinking in the local public house.

== First accident and aftermath ==
One Saturday night, in May 1836, after a drinking session with friends, Carter was persuaded to climb a tree in search of bird's eggs, in the course of which he missed his hold, falling 40 feet to the ground and severely damaging his cervical vertebrae. He survived, but was left effectively paralysed from below the neck, though with some movement in the chest and left shoulder.

Articles about Carter's injuries appeared in The Lancet on 19 July 1856 and 27 October 1860, some years after his death. His case was described by doctors as "the most remarkable....with which we are acquainted" due to him living for another 14 years after the accident. A post-mortem revealed that paralysis had been caused by compression of the spinal cord due to displacement of the vertebrae; the fact that the cord had not been severed allowed the continued functioning of the autonomic system which accounted for his survival.

== Career beginnings ==
Carter was now totally dependent on others for care and, obviously, unable to work. The shock also inclined him to seek solace in religion and prayer, which he had previously forsaken. After 6 weeks of recovery, he moved, with his wife, for reasons of economy and practicality, back to his father's house, where he was attended by friends and family.

About a year after the accident, he read an account of how Elizabeth Kinning, an inmate of a Liverpool asylum, having lost the use of her limbs, learnt to draw using her mouth. He began to do the same thing, using either a slate or a piece of paper pinned to his pillow, and a pencil or very-fine brush held in his mouth.

By perseverance, he taught himself to draw and paint, and to such a great proficiency that belied his disability. He devoted himself mainly to line-drawing, and with a specially adapted desk, and the help of an attendant to supply his materials, he produced work widely considered beautiful. He was also able to write legibly using the same method.

Carter became something of a celebrity, and received personal visits from many eminent people, including leading members of the medical profession, the Church, and artists such as George Richmond. His life and work was still the subject of many articles in journals several decades after his death, in Britain, the United States and elsewhere.

== Second accident and death ==
On 21 May 1850, he was involved in an accident, when the small carriage in which he was travelling overturned; his system received so severe a shock that he never recovered, and he died on 4 June that same year. His dying words, which reflected his new-found faith after the accident of 1836, were carefully recorded:

"O Lord, have mercy on me ! Help me through this misery, and lead me in the way everlasting. Help me through the valley of death, and pardon and forgive all my sins; and receive me into thy heavenly kingdom, O Lord, I beseech thee, for Jesus Christ's sake. Amen. O Lord Jesus, make haste to help me."

== Works ==
The Rev. W. J. Dampier, vicar of Coggeshall, published a memoir in 1850 (reissued in 1875). A list of eighty-seven of Carter's drawings was given, with the names of the owners at the time. They include drawings after Albrecht Dürer, Raphael, Rembrandt, Van Dyke, and Landseer. They resemble fine line-engravings and as George Richmond, who knew Carter well, commented to the author of the book ''The power of imitation is most extraordinary.''

Of his original works, his best, and most widely acclaimed is A Ratcatcher and his Dogs (1849), which drew uniform praise in all of its reviews, and a copy of which was acquired by Queen Victoria; Landseer described the work as the finest specimen of animal drawing he had ever seen. Other works of importance include Our Father who art in Heaven, and Innocence (the latter based on a work by Hermann Winterhalter).

== See also ==
- Quadriplegia
- Sarah Biffen (1784–1850), mouth artist, born without arms
- Bartram Hiles (1872–1927), a mouth artist who lost both arms in an accident
- Christy Brown
- Association of Mouth and Foot Painting Artists of the World
