= Thomas Schweicker =

German artist and calligrapher

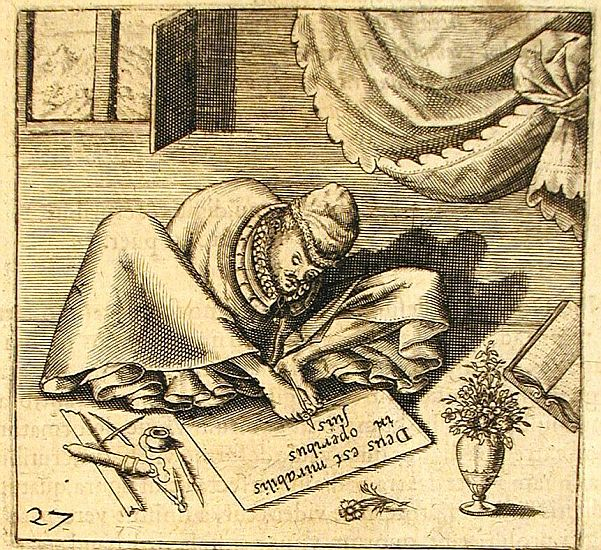
- Self-portrait
- Born: 21 December 1540; Schwäbisch Hall, Germany
- Died: 7 October 1602 (aged 61)
- Occupations: Artist, calligrapher

Thomas Schweicker (21 December 1540 – 7 October 1602) was a German artist and calligrapher. Despite being born without arms or hands, he became known for his skills as a painter and calligrapher, using his feet to create his art.

== Life ==
Schweicker was born on 21 December 1540 in Schwäbisch Hall, to Hans and Dorothea Schweicker. His father was a baker and a councilor, and later a judge. Schweicker was the sixth of eight children, and had four brothers and three sisters.

He was born without arms, presumably due to amniotic band syndrome. Nevertheless, he learned not only to master everyday tasks like washing and dressing himself, but also to write, by using his feet.

At the age of seven, Schweicker started his schooling, and later attended the Schwäbisch Hall Latin school at the age of twelve.

== Calligraphy and celebrity status ==
Schweicker had a talent for calligraphy, and soon became adept at creating elaborate documents. This, combined with his 'unusual' technique soon made him a celebrity. Many visitors came to Schwäbisch Hall to see him, watch him work, and buy a piece of his art. In 1570, he met both Holy Roman Emperor Maximilian II and Prince-Elector Augustus of Saxony, and impressed them with his work. In 1584, Schweicker was invited to perform at court in Heidelberg, where he stayed until 1598, primarily working as a painter.

== Death ==
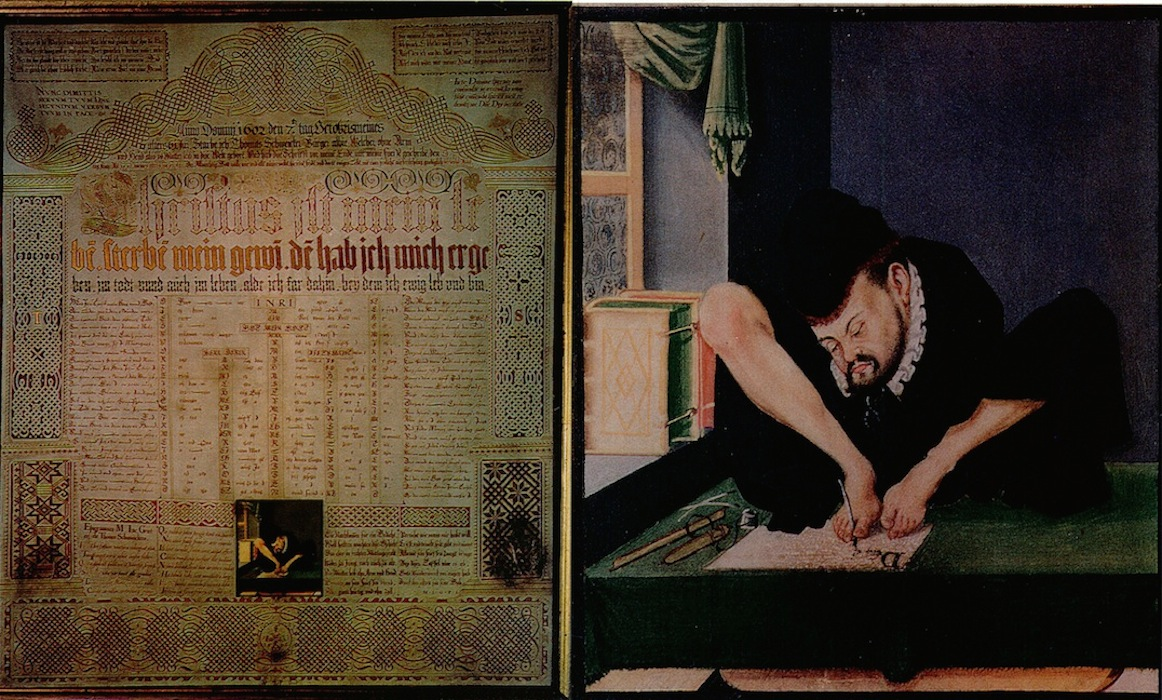
Memorial plaque to Thomas Schweicker at St Michael's church, Schwäbisch Hall

Schweicker died in the early morning hours of 7 October 1602 following a brief illness. He was buried at St Michael's church in Schwäbisch Hall. He had a self-prepared death certificate, crafted a decade earlier, along with a portrayal of him at work, which continues to be exhibited there.
