= Eli Bowen =

Sideshow performer (1844–1924)

The Legless Acrobat
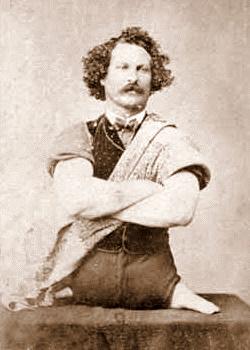
- Bowen in 1867, age 23
- Born: Eli Bowen; October 14, 1844; Richland County, Ohio, U.S.
- Died: May 4, 1924 (aged 79); New York City, U.S.
- Occupations: Circus artist, sideshow artist
- Spouse: Mattie Haight
- Children: 4

Eli Bowen (October 14, 1844 – May 4, 1924) was an American sideshow performer known as "The Legless Wonder", or "The Legless Acrobat". He was also billed as "The Handsomest Man in Showbiz" and the "Wonder of the Wide, Wide World". His peak weight was 140 pounds (64 kg); his height was 24 inches (61 cm).

== Early life ==
Eli Bowen was born on October 14, 1844 in Richland County, Ohio, to Robert and Sarah Bowen. His other seven siblings were of normal complexion and they all loved and supported their impaired brother.

According to the literature, in 1857, at age 13 he joined the traveling circus group Major Brown's Colosseum, where he was performing acrobatic tumbling, such as cartwheels, somersaults, and backflips. However, 1860 census records demonstrate that he was living with his parents and attended school. Only starting from 1870 census, after his father's death in 1865, did Bowen begin to describe his occupation as "showman".

== Medical condition ==
Bowen was born with phocomelia, a rare congenital condition historically known as "seal limbs", in which his feet were attached directly to his hips, leaving him without fully developed legs. His upper body developed normally, and his seven siblings were unaffected.

As a child, Bowen learned to walk on his hands using wooden blocks and gradually developed the upper-body strength that later enabled him to perform acrobatic feats.

As an adult, Bowen stood 24 inches (61 cm) tall and weighed up to 140 pounds (64 kg).

== Career ==
After his father's death in 1865, Bowen began pursuing show business as a full-time occupation. By the 1870 United States census, at age 25, he described his occupation as a "showman".

At age 31, in 1876, Bowen joined the Pullman Brothers Side Show. Three years later he moved to Cooper, Bailey & Co., before later performing with the circuses of James Anthony Bailey and P. T. Barnum. During this period, Bowen appeared in both small travelling sideshows and some of the largest circuses of the nineteenth century. At age 52, in 1897, he performed with the Barnum & Bailey Circus during its tour of England.

Throughout his years as a performer, Bowen was billed as "The Legless Acrobat" and became one of the best-known American sideshow performers of the nineteenth century. Advertising also promoted him as "The Legless Wonder", "The Handsomest Man in Showbiz", and "The Wonder of the Wide, Wide World".

Bowen built his reputation on feats of strength, balance, and acrobatics. Drawing on the upper-body strength he had developed as a child, he performed cartwheels, somersaults, and backflips, and became famous for performing acrobatic routines atop a 13-foot (4.0 m) pole.

Bowen also appeared with fellow sideshow performer Charles B. Tripp, who was billed as the "Armless Wonder". Together they rode and steered a tandem bicycle while exchanging comic lines, including "Watch your steps" and "Keep your hands off me".

Bowen continued performing into old age. At age 79, he was still performing in the Dreamland Circus Side Show at Coney Island, bringing to a close a career that had lasted approximately 50 years.

== Marriage and family ==
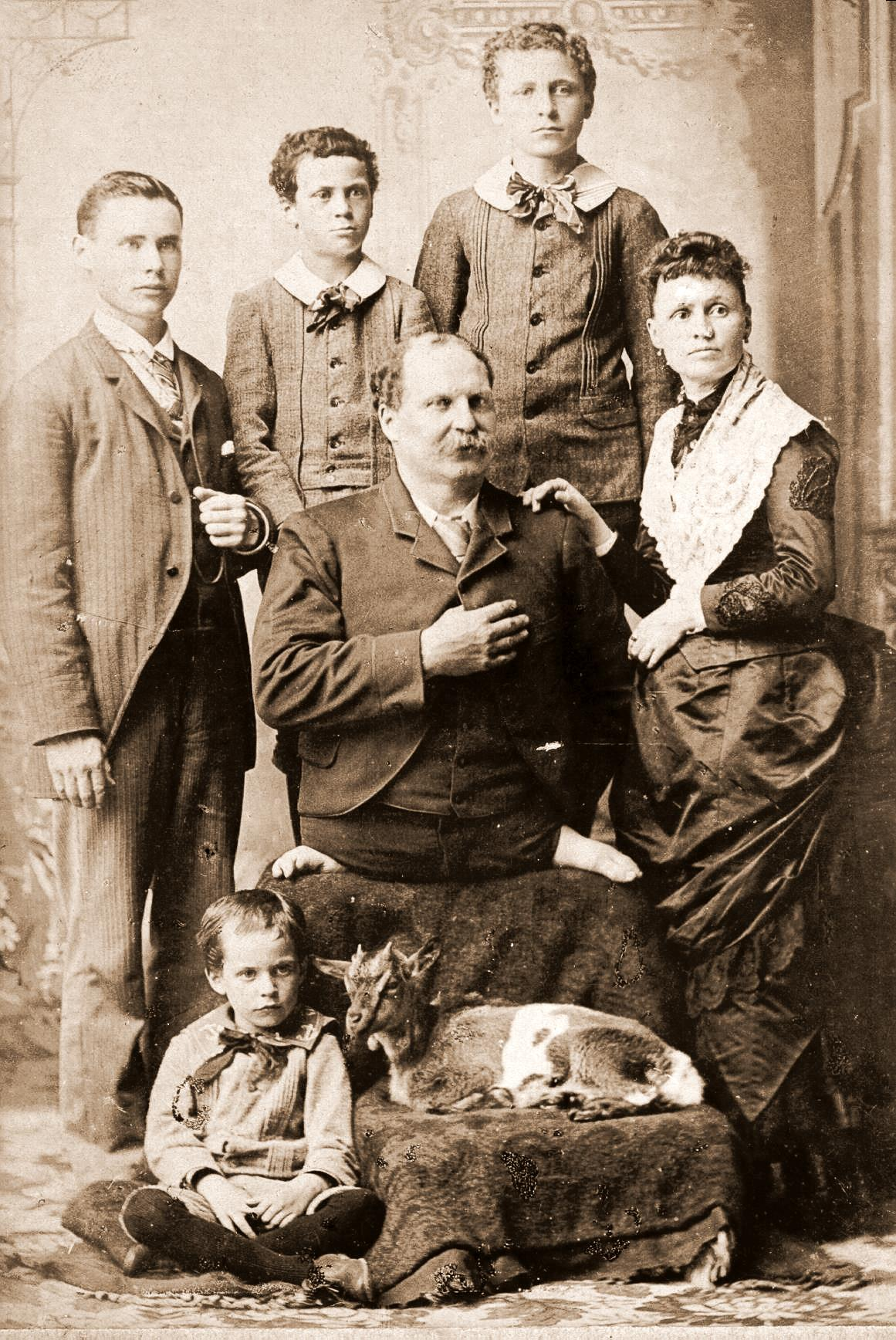
The Bowen family

When he was 26, Bowen married Martha N. Haines, sometimes described as Mattie Haight, aged 16. They raised four healthy sons, named Frank, Robert, Adrian and Victor. The fliers given to the spectators specified that one became a judge and another a successful merchant.

A brief history of his life was retold in a pamphlet The Wonder of the Wide, Wide World: The True History of Mr. Eli Bowen which was published in 1880.

== Death ==
On May 4, 1924, Bowen died at the Dreamland circus in Coney Island from pleurisy, which was caused by pneumonia. He was buried in Lowell, Indiana.
