= Janarthanan Kesavan =

Indian Mouth Painter

- Born: 19 September 1991; Chennai, Tamil Nadu, India
- Occupation: Mouth painter
- Awards: Best Creative Child; Bal Shree

Janarthanan Kesavan (born 19 September 1991) (also known as Jana) is an Indian Mouth painter based in Chennai, Tamil Nadu. He won the National Bal Shree Honour.

== Early life ==
K. Janarthanan was born in Chennai on 19 September 1991. He lost his hand in an electric accident when he was eight years old. He learned how to write and paint using his mouth.

== Awards and recognition ==
- 2004: "Bal Shree" award received from the Indian President, Dr. A.P.J. Abdul Kalam
