= Dolors Vázquez Aznar =

Spanish painter

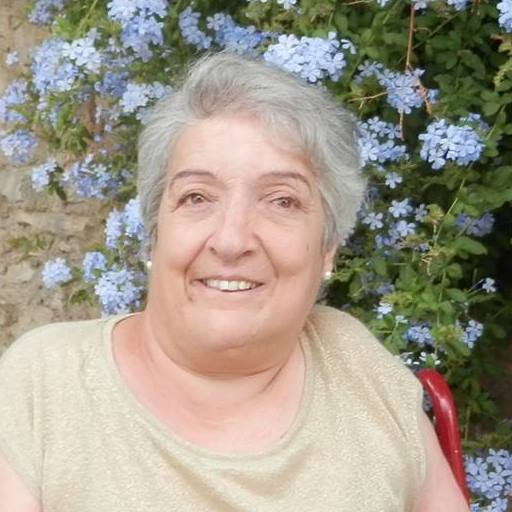
- Born: María Dolors Vázquez Aznar; 15 March 1955; Valencia, Spain
- Died: 22 February 2014 (aged 58); Valencia, Spain
- Education: University of Valencia
- Occupations: Painter, lawyer

María Dolors Vázquez Aznar (15 March 1955 – 22 February 2014) was a Spanish realist painter and lawyer.

== Biography ==
Dolors Vázquez Aznar was born with cerebral palsy. She later experienced polio, which affected mobility in her arms, facial muscles, neck, and eventually speech. Despite her disabilities, with the support of her family and an energetic and hard-working character, she learned to use her left foot in the same way that other children used their hands. She earned a licentiate in Law from the University of Valencia in 1983 and dedicated herself to painting professionally in 1995.

She died on 22 February 2014 after a severe bout of pneumonia.

== Artistic career ==
As a painter, Vázquez considered herself self-taught, since she began at a young age, learning on her own to paint with her left foot. She began to exhibit her work in 1973, initially participating in collective exhibitions in Valencia, and little by little throughout various Spanish cities such as Villareal and Toro. She also had a temporary exhibit at the ONCE Foundation's Museo Triflológico.

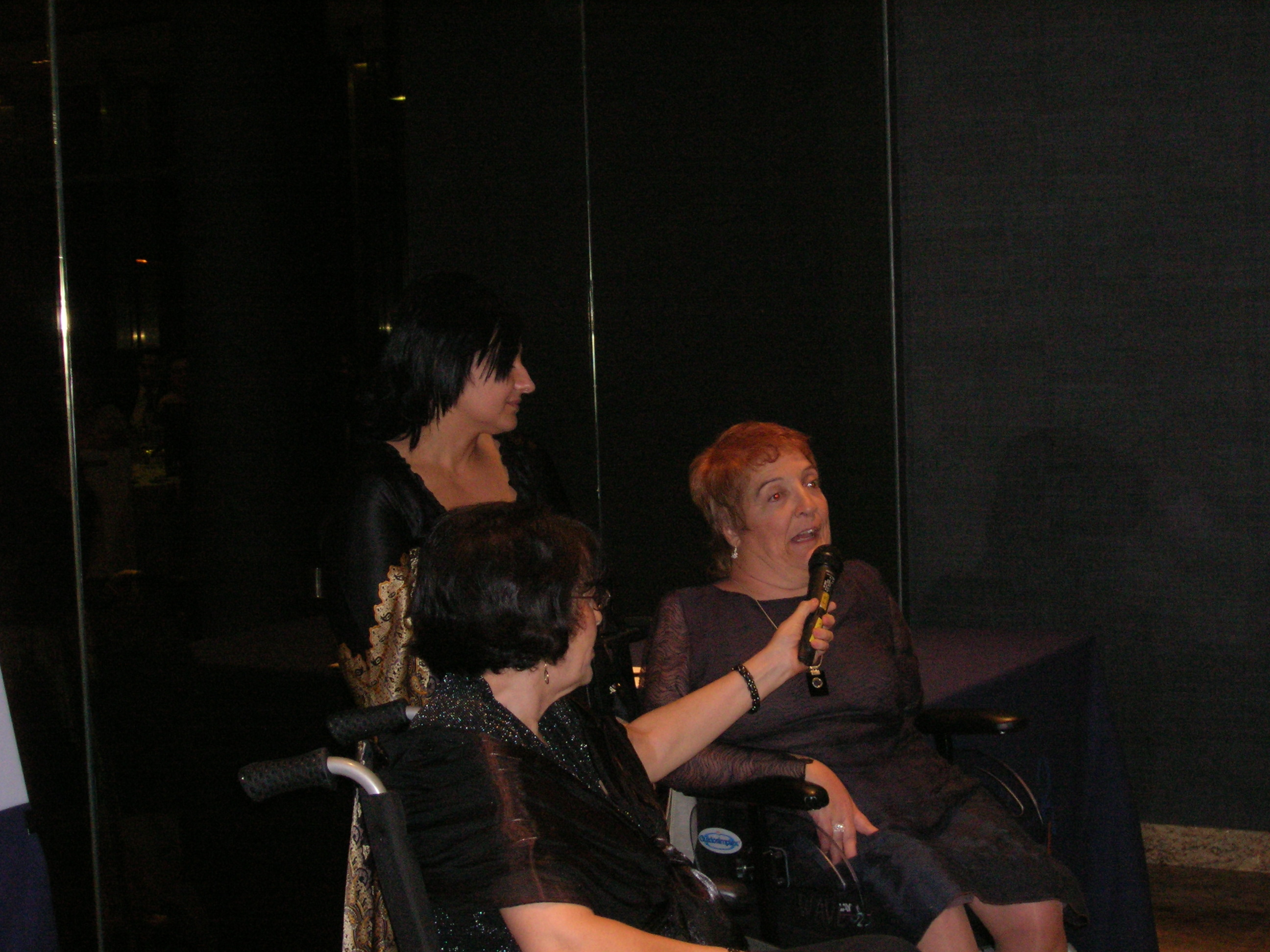
Receiving the COCEMFE award

In 1988 she became a fellow of the Association of Mouth and Foot Painting Artists of the World (AMFPA). There she participated in numerous solo and group exhibitions in Madrid, Toledo, Cáceres, Badajoz, Murcia, Valencia, Alicante, Melilla, and Córdoba.

While at AMFPA she received training in other areas such as music, creative writing, and modeling. She began to publicly exhibit her work in these fields in 2003.

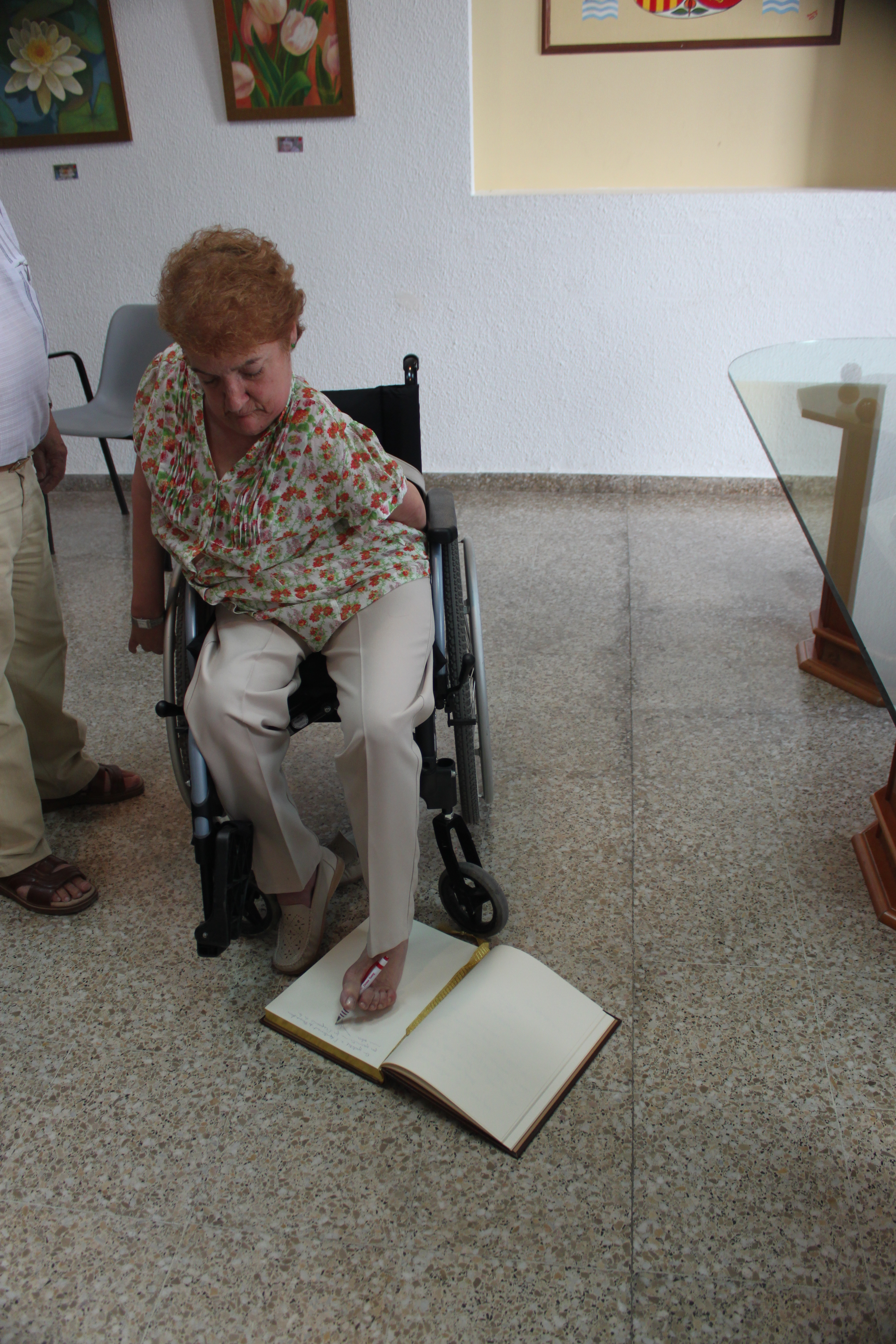
Signing a book at an exhibition

Vázquez had an initial contact with the Intercontinental Christian Fraternity of People with Disabilities (FRATER) in the 1970s, but it was not until a decade later that she committed herself to the movement and began to assume more responsibilities. In 1991 she became part of the diocesan team of FRATER of Valencia, becoming its leader from 1993 to 1998. From 2000 to 2006 she was a member of the General Team of FRATER of Spain, as representative of the Fraternity of Castellón. She was also elected intercontinental coordinator at the 4th Intercontinental Committee of July 2005 in El Escorial, Madrid. She was reelected to the position in 2010 at the 5th Intercontinental Committee of Porto.

That year she received the award of the Spanish Confederation of People with Physical and Organic Disability (COCEMFE), given annually to recognize work done by public and private bodies, associations, companies, media, and public figures in favor of the rights, participation, and integration of people with disabilities and their families.

During the Continental Assembly of Africa and Madagascar in January 2014, she fell ill with pneumonia. After a long hospital stay, first at the Saint-Luc Hospital in Brussels and then at the Hospital La Fe in Valencia, Dolors Vázquez Aznar died on 22 February 2014.

== Works ==
Dolors Vázquez Aznar's pictorial works belong to the realistic style, often with naturalistic motifs.

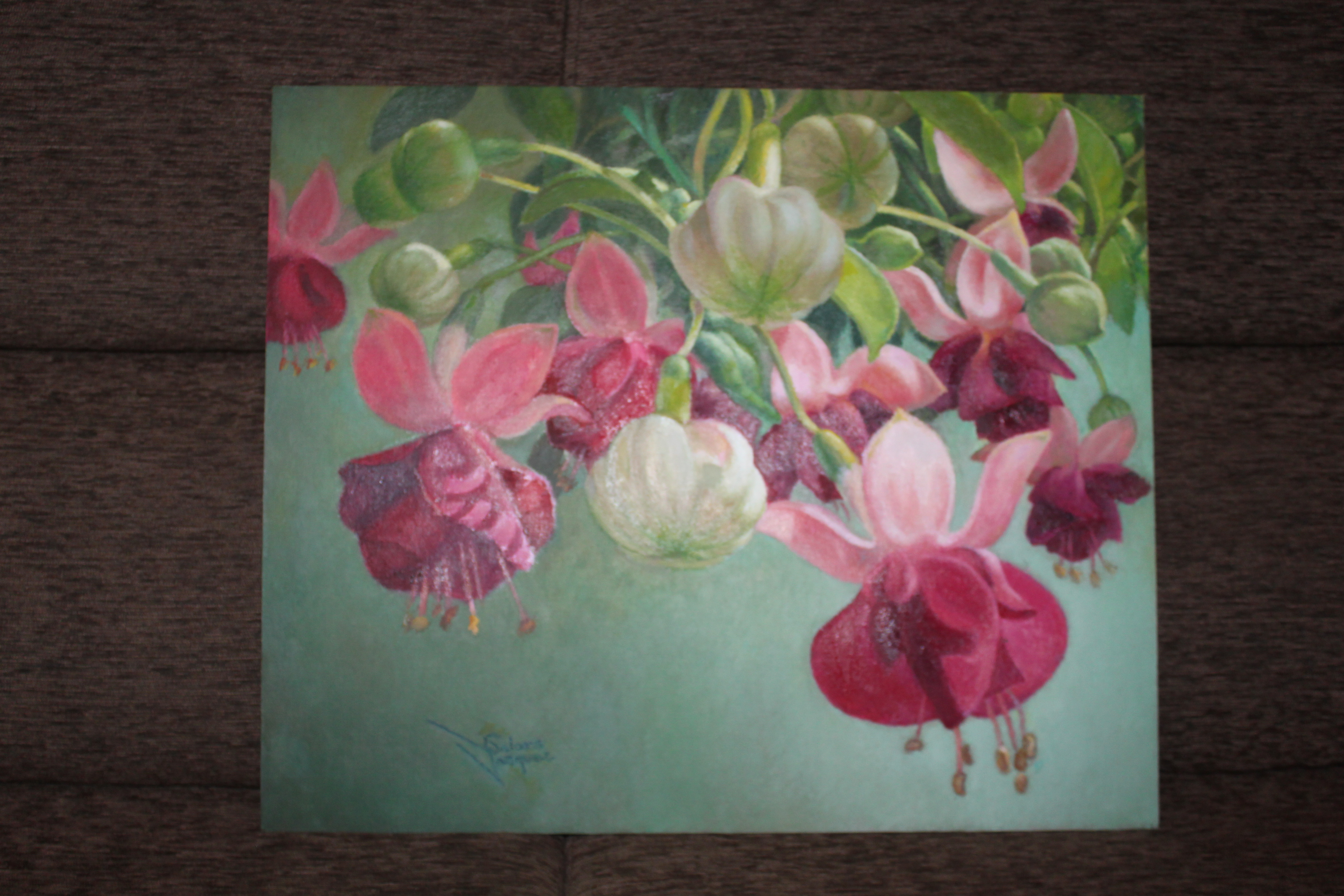
Los pendientes de la reina

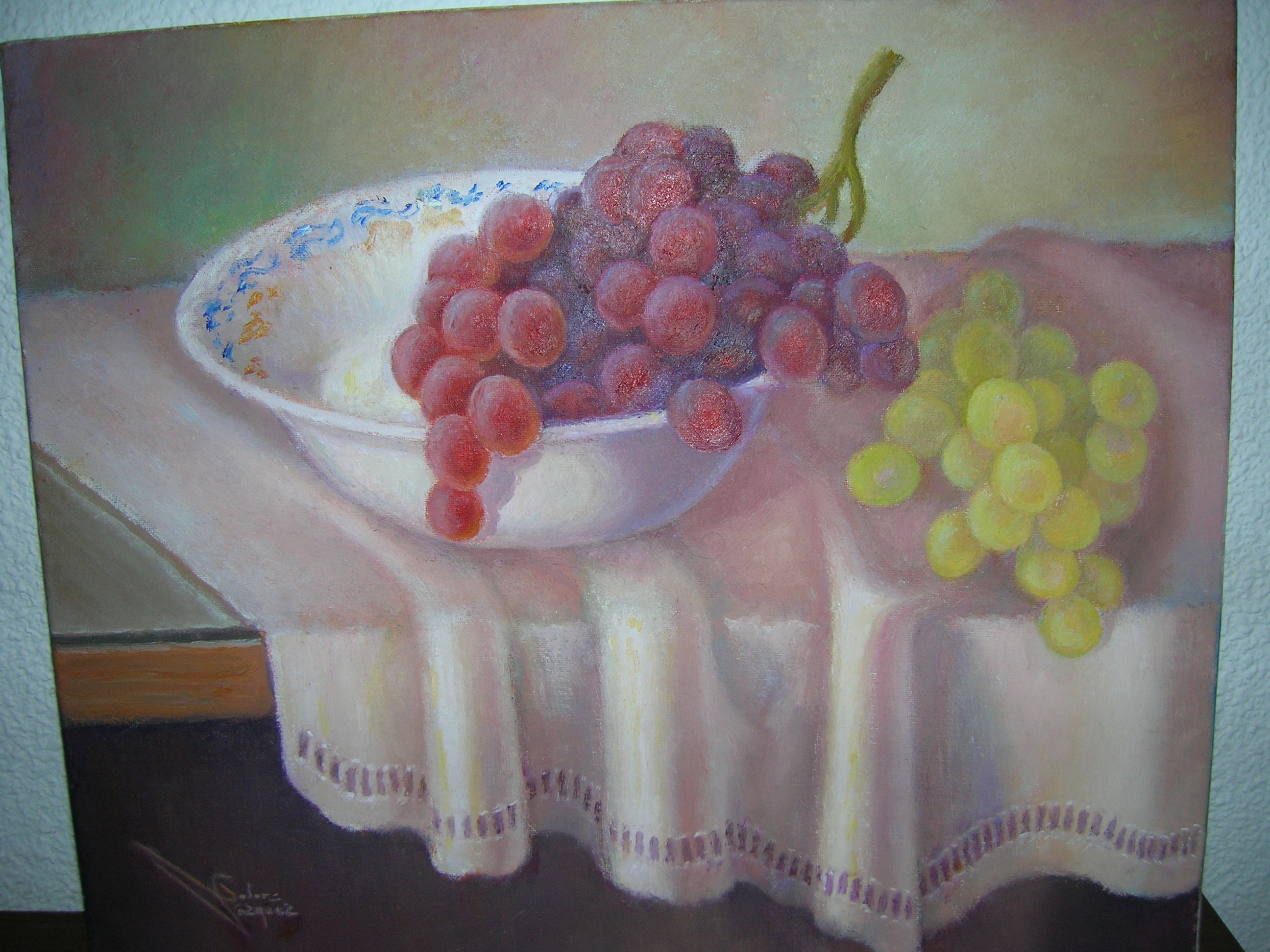
Uvas con mantel

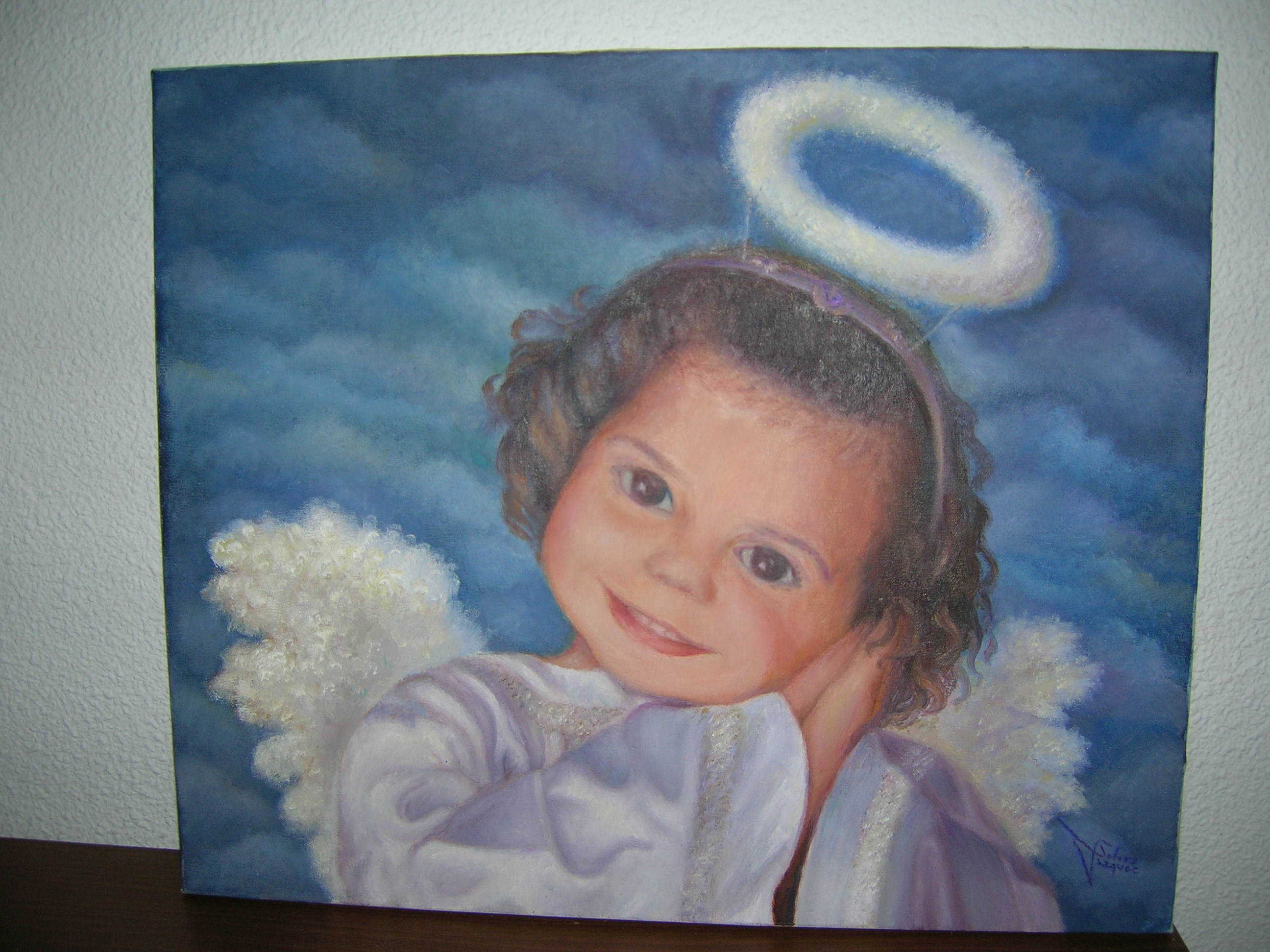
Carla, mi ángel

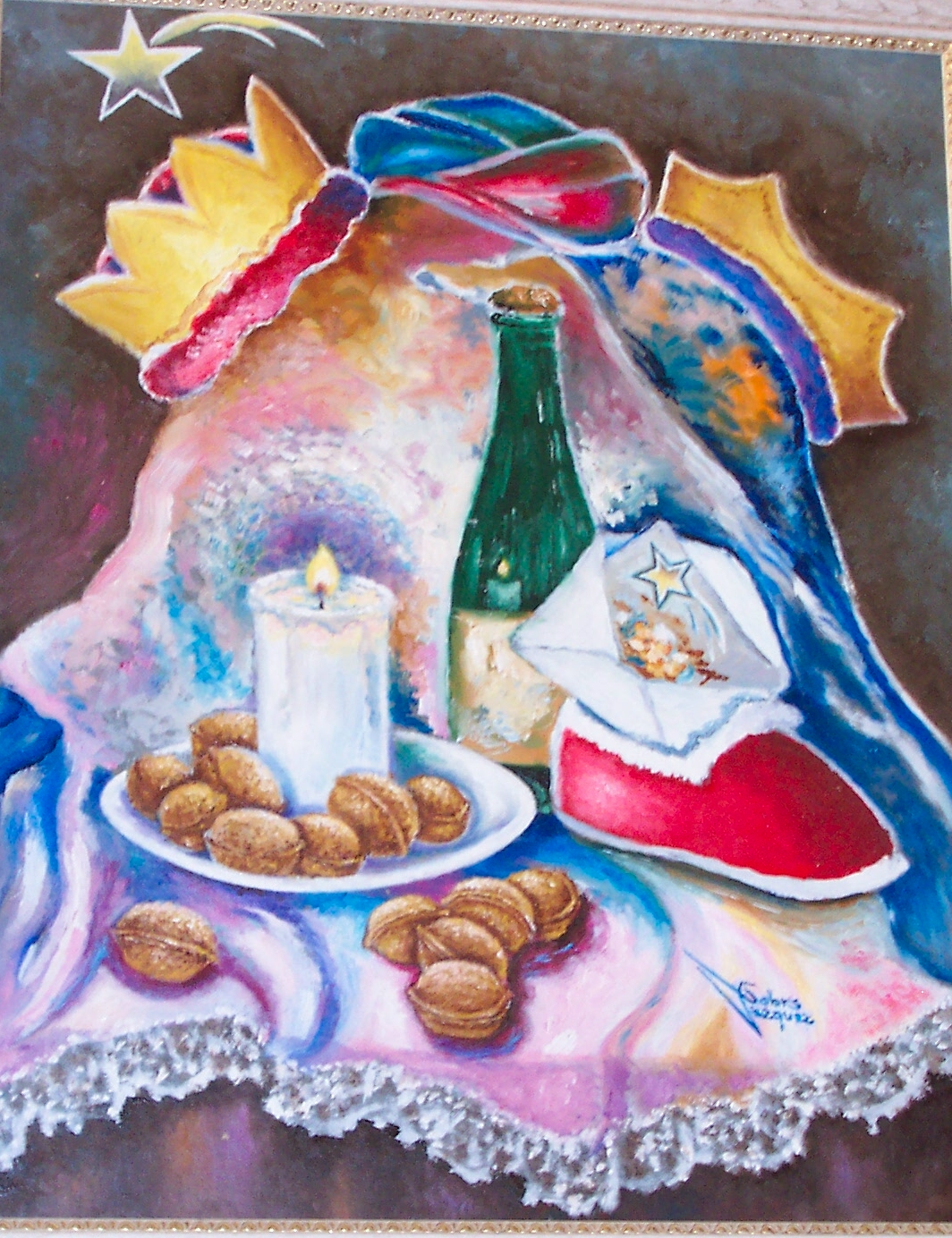
Cuadro de Navidad

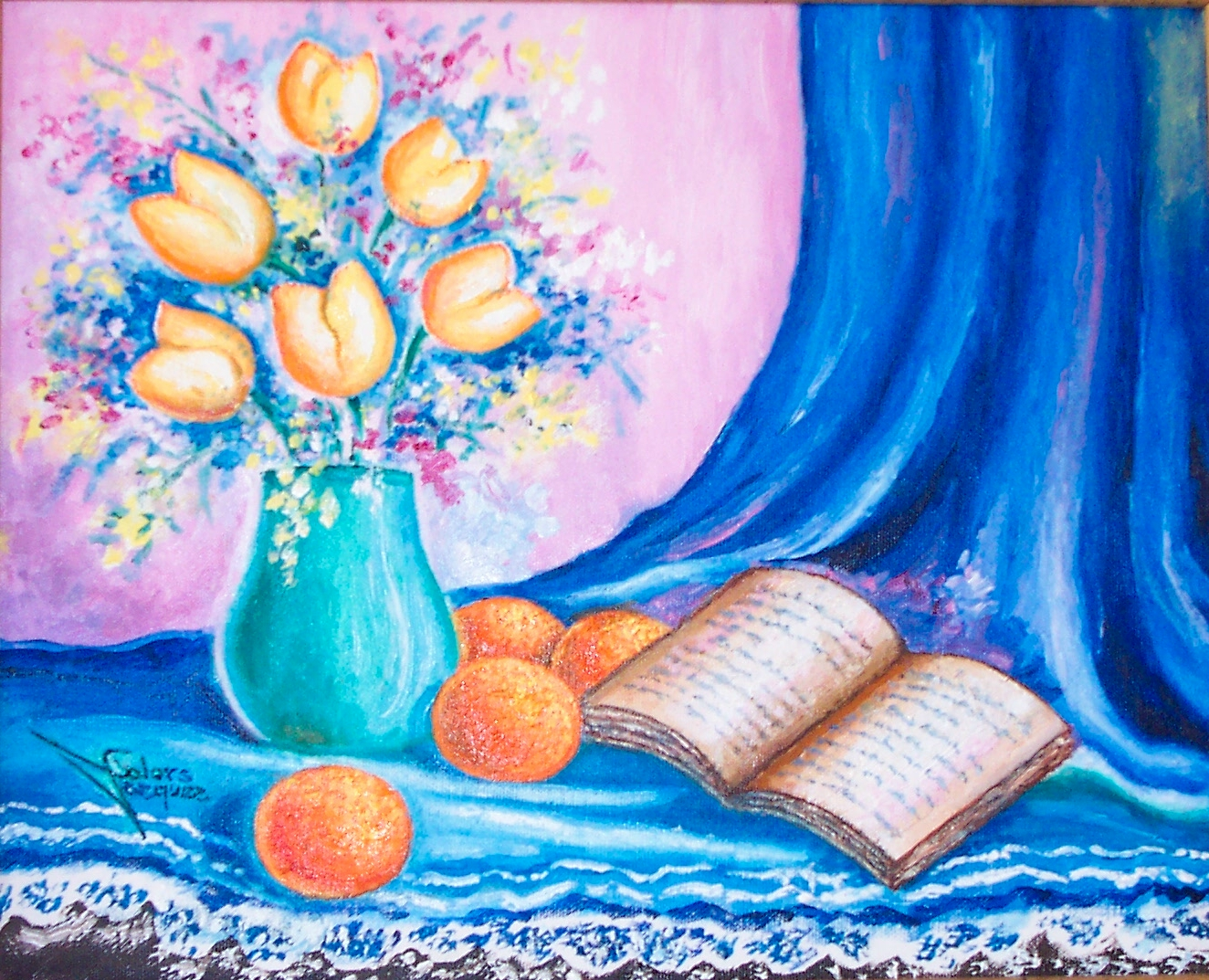
Flores con libro
