= Sani Maikatanga =

Nigerian photographer

Sani Mohammed Maikatanga (photojournalist)
- Born: Sani Mohammed Maikatanga; 15 August 1975 (age 50); Nasarawa, Kano, Nigeria
- Education: Federal College of Education Technical Bichi
- Occupations: Photojournalism, Photography
- Years active: 1992–present
- Known for: Argungu Fishing Festival Photojournalist
- Spouse: Salaha Muhammad
- Children: 4
- Parents: Alhaji Muhammadu Maikatanga (father); Hajiya Hauwa Gumel (mother)
- Awards: See below

Sani Mohammed Maikatanga (born 15 August 1975) is a Nigerian photographer who won the Global Landscapes Forum (GLF) Africa 2022 Photo Competition. Maikatanga is best known for his work with indigenous people and isolated communities in northern Nigeria, as well as traditional activities and popular landscapes. His coverage of the popular Argungu fishing festival earned him the GLF Africa Award 2022 Photo Competition.

== Early life and education ==
Sani Maikatanga was born in Nasarawa Local Government, Kano State, Nigeria to Alhaji Muhammadu Maikatanga and Hajiya Hauwa Gumel. He attended Giginyu Special Primary School between 1983 and 1989, Government Secondary School Tarauni between 1989-1991 and took further education at Federal College of Education Technical Bichi where he read electrical engineering.

== Career ==
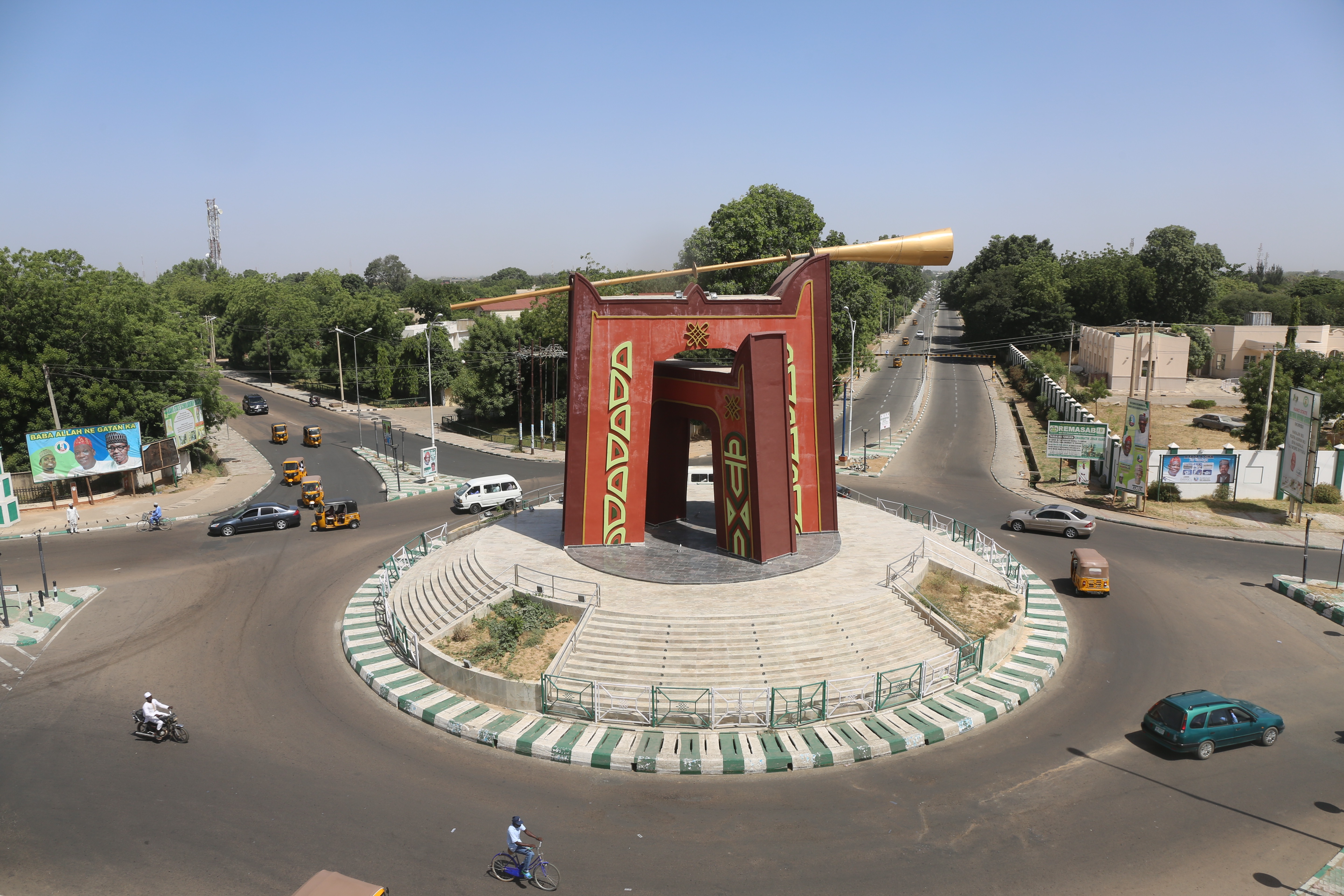
Sani Maitanga received a Wiki Loves Monuments 2022 in Nigeria Winners 2022 award for the Kano Golden Jubilee roundabout.

Maikatanga began his career after leaving school with Salisu Baso and Tijjani NTA studio in Kawo, then moved to Babson Studio on Laraba Road and Galaxy Photo Studio in Giginyu before venturing into photojournalism in 2000.

Maikatanga began his professional photography career in 2000 as a reporter and photographer for the popular Hausa movie publication FIM Magazine. He later worked as a freelance photojournalist for Leadership Newspaper from 2005 to 2006 before joining Media Trust, publishers of the award-winning Daily Trust newspaper, in 2009.

After leaving Media Trust in 2021, Sani Maikatanga established his own company, Sani Maikatanga Photography, and resumed his career as a photojournalist, focusing on indigenous people and isolated communities in northern Nigeria. Among his coverage was the popular Argungu Fishing Festival, which earned him an award with his photograph, Fishers on the Run, taken at the Argungu Festival, as the first winner after receiving the most votes.

Maikatanga rose to prominence primarily through his horse racing photography, also known as Durbar in northern Nigeria. He also covers the majority of Niger Republic festival events, such as the Salt Cure Festival in In-Gall and the Bianou Festival in Agadez. Famous media outlets such as BBC Hausa, Media Trust, Associated Press, Deutsche Welle, Reuters, New York Post, and The Guardian use his photographs.

== Honors and awards ==
Maikatanga is a well-known photographer in northern Nigeria who has become a household name among young people and women. He has received numerous awards, certificates, and recognition from various agencies and foreign missions, the most recent of which was from the Global Landscapes Forum (GLF) Africa.

=== Awards ===
- Médecins Sans Frontières (Doctors Without Borders) letter of appreciation for being helpful, active, and motivated during the MSF Holland cholera program in Kano in 2000.
- Practical First Aid award, organized by the Nigerian Red Cross Society.
- Award of excellence given by Hausa Movies Group for over ten years of outstanding contribution to the film industry.
- Award of Merit from Northern Trendz for contributions to youth empowerment.
- Third-place winner of the photo contest prize for the China-Nigeria friendly in pictures competition in 2019.
- Rescue the Women Foundation's Inspirational and Creativity Award (REWOFO) 2020.
- Award of Excellence by Inspire Arewa Youth Initiative 2020.
- Award of Excellence by FASHMEX 2020
- Global Landscape Forum (GLF) Africa Photo Competition First Prize Winner 2022.
- Wiki Loves Monuments 2022 in Nigeria/Winners 2022 award
