= Brom Wikstrom =

American painter

Brom Wikstrom is an American artist from Seattle, Washington, who paints by mouth. He is a life member of The International Association of Mouth and Foot Painting Artists. His paintings have been displayed around the world.

== Early life ==
Wikstrom was born in Seattle, Washington. He graduated from Queen Anne High School where he illustrated the school yearbook and went on to complete a 2-year course in advertising art at Seattle College.

== Career ==
Wikstrom began his career as an apprentice in his father's commercial art studio, and then became a sign painter. He also hitchhiked and hopped freight trains around the country including a journey to attend the 1973 Ann Arbor Blues and Jazz Festival. He later worked as a seafood processor in Dutch Harbor, Alaska and for an industrial electric display company in New Orleans.

Wikstrom sustained an injury to his spinal cord while swimming in the Mississippi River and became a high–level quadriplegic at the age of 21. After a lengthy rehabilitation he began to paint using his mouth to hold the brush and started volunteering his time at Children's Hospital in Seattle. He speaks to school and community groups and operates his own gallery in Seattle's Wallingford neighborhood titled Wikstrom Brothers Gallery. His paintings are included in many collections such as Ballard High School in Seattle. His paintings have been displayed around the world and he has served as delegate to conventions in Buenos Aires, Lima, Peru, Shanghai, Sydney, Vienna, Brussels, Lisbon, Athens and New York City.

== Honors and awards ==
Wikstrom has given painting demonstrations to the Emperor and Empress of Japan, Andy Warhol and thousands of people around the world. Washington State Governor Christine Gregoire appointed Brom a commissioner on the Washington State Arts Commission.

In 2011, Wikstrom was presented an award as artist-in-action during Seattle's Annual Uptown Stroll. He was awarded a fellowship to the Vermont Studio Center in 2015. He and his wife toured the entire country by van after spending a month developing his art at the creative center.

== Personal life ==
Wikstrom lives in Seattle with his wife Anne, a gardener, dental hygienist and world traveler. He is a Life member and past president of the Puget Sound Group of Northwest Artists. He has worked as staff receptionist at the Burke Museum of Natural History at the University of Washington since 1984.
