= A Woman in White =

- Directed by: Claude Autant-Lara
- Written by: Jean Aurenche; René Wheeler
- Based on: Journal d'une femme en blanc (Diary of a Woman in White); 1964 novel by André Soubiran
- Produced by: Ghislaine Autant-Lara
- Starring: Marie-José Nat; Jean Valmont; Claude Gensac
- Cinematography: Michel Kelber
- Edited by: Madeleine Gug
- Music by: Michel Magne
- Production companies: Gaumont; Arco Film
- Distributed by: Gaumont Distribution
- Release date: 28 April 1965
- Running time: 110 minutes
- Countries: France; Italy
- Language: French
- Box office: $17.6 million

A Woman in White (French: Le Journal d'une femme en blanc) is a 1965 French-Italian drama film directed by Claude Autant-Lara and starring Marie-José Nat, Jean Valmont and Claude Gensac. It was written by Jean Aurenche and André Soubiran.

The film's sets were designed by the art director Max Douy.

== Plot summary ==
The story follows Claude Sauvage, a young gynecologist working in a large Parisian maternity hospital during the 1960s. As she navigates her demanding professional environment, Claude is confronted with the challenges of providing care to women facing difficult reproductive issues, including unwanted pregnancies and the controversial topic of abortion.

Claude encounters a range of patients, from struggling young women to those burdened by large families, highlighting the social and economic pressures women face. Throughout her work, she is determined to support women's rights to control their bodies despite societal taboos and legal restrictions of the time.

Complicating her situation, Claude herself becomes pregnant by her colleague, Dr. Pascal, which forces her to confront her own values and the consequences of her choices. The film is presented as a personal diary, offering insight into Claude's internal struggles with professional sexism, personal responsibility, and her commitment to compassionate care.

== Cast ==
- Marie-José Nat as Claude Sauvage
- Claude Gensac as Mlle Viralleau
- Jean Valmont as Pascal
- Paloma Matta as Mariette Hugon
- Jean-Pierre Dorat as Landeau
- Ellen Bernsen as'Mme Michelon
- Robert Benoît as Yves Hugon
- Martine de Breteuil as La mère de Mariette
- Germaine Delbat as Un docteur
- Daniel Ceccaldi as 'L'inspecteur Georget
