= National Bal Bhavan =

- राष्ट्रीय बाल भवन
- Nickname: NBB
- Formation: 1956
- Founder: Jawaharlal Nehru
- Legal status: Active
- Headquarters: New Delhi, India
- Location: National Bal Bhavan, Kotla Marg, ITO, Mandi House, Delhi, 110002
- Region served: India
- Affiliations: Ministry of Education
- Website: nationalbalbhavan.nic.in
- Formerly called: Bal Bhavan Society India

National Bal Bhavan (NBB) (transl. National Children's House) is an autonomous institute, run and funded by the Ministry of Human Resource Development, Government of India headquartered in New Delhi. It was founded in 1956 by Prime Minister, Jawaharlal Nehru. It was established with the purpose to provide opportunities for creative pursuits to children in the age group of 5 to 16 years.

Indira Gandhi was appointed as the first chairperson of National Bal Bhavan. Currently, there are 73 Bal Bhavans across India, which are affiliated to the National Bal Bhavan, New Delhi.

== See also ==
- National Bal Shree Honour
- Children in India
