= Edward Rainey =

Scottish tetrapalegic painter

Edward Rainey (8 July 1961 – 7 May 2014) was a Scottish tetraplegic painter; he used a brush held in his mouth to create his works.

Rainey was born in Glasgow, Scotland. At sixteen he left school and after a short time as a trainee butcher he joined the British Army. During a summer holiday in Spain in 1984 when Edward was 23 he had a diving accident and was left paralysed from the neck down.

After this accident he took stock of his life, rediscovered his faith in God and decided to try his first love, painting, using a brush held in his mouth.

Rainey met and presented the Princess Royal with one of his paintings and met Princess Diana who attended one of his exhibitions. Rainey's ambition was to graduate from the Glasgow School of Art and become a full member of the Association of Mouth and Foot Painting Artists of the World.

His influences included Vincent van Gogh and Salvador Dalí. He painted for Princess Anne and Paul McCartney.
