= Mariam Paré =

American artist (born 1975)

Mariam Paré is a Moroccan-American artist, disability advocate, and motivational speaker. She works in oil, acrylic and modern mixed-media techniques and collaborations in videography and photography.

== Early life ==
Paré was born on December 1, 1975, in Morocco. Her father was a US Marine and her mother was Moroccan. She attended the College of DuPage, and at 20, was shot in her friend's car, which affected her spinal cord. While in rehabilitation, her therapist taught her how to write with her mouth, as well as draw. She later earned a bachelor's degree in fine art.

== Career ==
Paré, as a visual artist works on oil, acrylic and modern mixed-media techniques in videography and photography. She owns an arts studio in Naperville, Illinois. Her paintings are often brightly colored depictions of people some which are imagined and others such as or Frida Kahlo. Paré presented renderings of Hoda Kotb and Kathie Lee Gifford to them during her appearance on The Today Show. She also shared a painting with Pierce Brosnan a painting she did of him as Agent 007.

In 2016, Paré participated Art in Motion and event that featured works by nearly two dozen art therapy patients of the Rehabilitation Institute of Chicago.

Shortly after learning to use her mouth to create art, Paré connected to the Mouth & Foot Painting Artists. In 2019 she was chosen as one of the four artists to design holidays for them.

Her work has been shown galleries and festivals both internationally and domestically in the US. In 2014, her work was shown in special exhibit "Unbroke: Art After Injury" that featured the works of four artists with spinal cord injuries at the Next Door Cafe in Lincoln Park. She completed a North American tour in 2015 including a stop at the St. Petersburg Museum of Fine Arts.

Paré part of the Tres Fridas Project, a collaboration with the artists Reveca Torres and Tara Ahern. The project recreated iconic artworks with people with disabilities as subjects. She was a featured artist in the Life Unseen project by the LIFEWTR bottled water.

Paré has hosted accessible art workshops in the USA and Canada for children of all abilities.

== Disability advocacy ==
Paré is an advocate for people with spinal cord injury and is a motivational speaker.

In 2017, she wrote an open letter to then US President Trump urging him to look out for disabled Americans when revising the nation's healthcare system.

== Awards and memberships ==
Paré is a member of the Association of Mouth and Foot Painting Artists Worldwide. Paré received a 3Arts Fellowship with University of Illinois at Chicago in 2020.
