= Rahma Haruna =

Subject of photograph in Nigeria

- Born: 1996 or 1997; Nigeria
- Died: 25 December 2016 (aged 19); Kano, Kano State, Nigeria

Rahma Haruna (1996 or 1997 – 25 December 2016) was a 19-year-old Nigerian teenager who became famous for a viral photo taken by photographer Sani Maikatanga.

== Life ==
Haruna was born sometime between 1996 and 1997 in Nigeria. At the age of six months, Haruna's legs and arms stopped growing except for one of her arms. She had an unknown disease that left her disabled, unable to do basic tasks such as walking, crawling, or even handling most items. Because of excessive pain in her extremities, she was always in constant pain and had to remain inside a plastic bucket. Shortly after a photo of her went viral, despite her severe disability, Rahma had ambitions, telling journalists she dreamt of starting a business.

In 2015 an anonymous person donated a wheelchair to ease her transport. Haruna's parents affirmed having spent about 1 million naira in treatment (US$2,737.89); however, she did not recover. She died of unknown causes on 25 December 2016, at age 19 in Kano, Nigeria.
