= Simona Atzori =

Italian artist and dancer

Simona Atzori (born 18 June 1974) is an Italian artist and dancer who was born in Milan. She was born without arms, and uses her feet to draw, write and perform all other daily activities.

Attempts were made to fit Simona with prosthetic arms at an early age, but she very quickly rejected them. She has said that she found the prosthetics extremely heavy and impractical, and it was much easier to use her feet to perform tasks.

She started painting at the age of 4 and her talent was soon noticed by artist Mario Barzon, who encouraged and supported her. In 1983, she was awarded a scholarship from the Association of Mouth and Foot Painting Artists of the World. A defining moment in her early career was an audience with Pope John Paul II, at which she presented him with a portrait of himself.

Simona also started to dance at the age of 6. Despite some initial opposition from teachers who felt that it was not appropriate, her own determination and the strong support of her mother enabled her to succeed in a discipline typically associated with the non-disabled.

In 1996, she commenced her studies at the University of Western Ontario in Canada. Her course in Visual Arts enabled her to combine the two passions of her life, and she graduated with honors in 2001.

Later Simona became associated with the Pescara Dance Festival, and has endowed this event with the Atzori Award, given to dancers and choreographers. She continues to perform and exhibit her work all over the world.

On 10 March 2006 Simona performed a dance routine during the Opening Ceremony of the Paralympic Games in Turin.

== See also ==
- Association of Mouth and Foot Painting Artists of the World
