= Lorenza Böttner =

German-Chilean multidisciplinary artist (1959–1994)

- Self-portrait of Böttner
- Born: 6 March 1959; Punta Arenas, Chile
- Died: 13 January 1994 (aged 34); Munich, Germany
- Known for: Dance, photography, street performance, drawing, and installation art

Lorenza Böttner (6 March 1959 – 13 January 1994) was a Chilean–German disabled transgender multidisciplinary visual artist.

Born in Chile, she moved to Germany following the amputation of both of her arms as a child, where she studied and began a career in art. Using several art media, including performance pieces and a method called "danced painting", she depicted social outcasts, and she portrayed Petra during opening and the closing ceremonies at the 1992 Summer Paralympics. Her self-portraiture featured eroticized and nurturing depictions of herself.

Diagnosed with HIV in 1985, she died in 1994 of AIDS-related complications in Munich. While she did not receive widespread recognition of her work during her life, documenta and Paul B. Preciado began showing her work from 2016 onward, and she is now recognized for her contributions to art history and representing disability in art.

== Early life ==
Little is known about Lorenza Böttner's early life. She was born on 6 March 1959 in Punta Arenas, Chile, to parents of German descent. At around 8 years old, she received an electric shock from power lines, and both of her arms were amputated at the shoulder. The Chilean children's magazine Mampato depicted her as an exemplar for other children: Despite losing her arms, the magazine said, she was able to use Christian language with others, persevere through her difficulties, and draw with a pencil in her mouth.

About six years after her amputation, she moved with her parents to Lichtenau, Germany, for better health services. She refused to use prosthetics and had a series of surgeries beginning in 1973. While in Lichtenau, she was educated in an orthopedic rehabilitation center. While Böttner experienced depression as a child, a friend of hers said in 2024: "It was her mother, Irene, who put the pen in Lorenza’s mouth, and put the will to live through art into Lorenza".

== Career ==
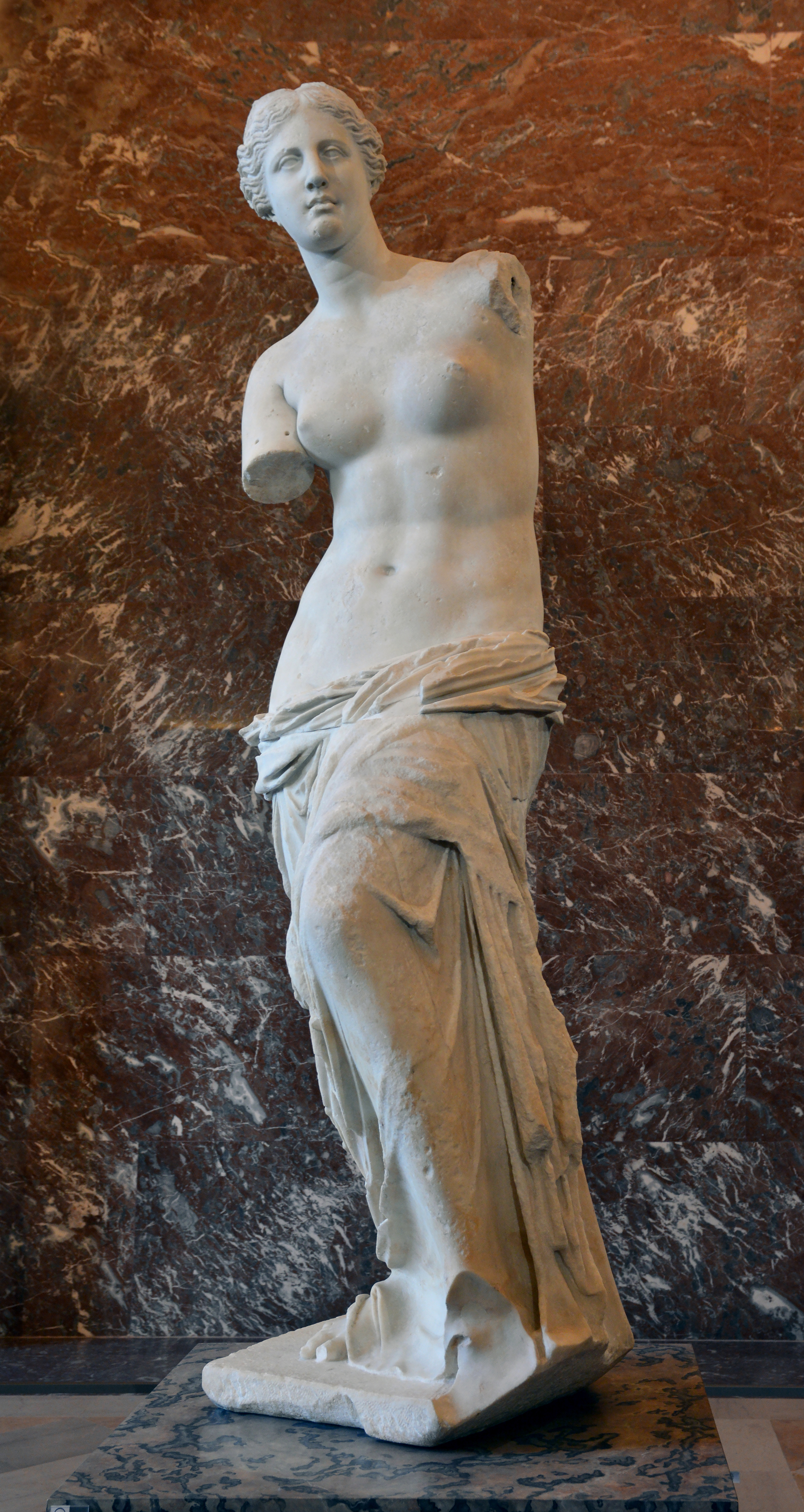
Böttner regularly depicted the Venus de Milo in her work.

Böttner enrolled in the Gesamthochschule Kassel (now a School of Art and Design) from 1978 to 1984. It was during this time at art school that she began publicly identifying as Lorenza. This opportunity inspired her to begin projects that were geared toward self-expression and self-exploration, and she developed a method she called "danced painting" and "pantomime painting" (tanz malerei and pantomime malerei). In one instance while carrying out a piece that included a series of photographs, she wore makeup that modified the appearance of her face, following a comment from a professor that she was a "walking performance". She completed a thesis called "Behindert!?"—literally meaning "Disabled?!"—which used historical and medical motifs of disability in its accompanying performance piece. Following graduation, she studied art in New York with financial assistance by the Disabled Artists Network.

Over the course of her career, her art widely varied in style and form, ranging from drawings to paintings to performances. She served as a model for photographers Robert Mapplethorpe and Joel-Peter Witkin, although she found their depictions of her disability dehumanizing. Describing her approach as "transition and not identity", the philosopher and art curator Paul B. Preciado says that while she used her feet and mouth to paint, the unique habitation of her body (transgender and disabled) allowed her to create an interdisciplinary movement, not only visual or performance. She depicted herself in art, as well as the armless Venus de Milo and what Preciado describes as "subaltern" persons: prostitutes in Europe, African Americans experiencing police violence in America, and depictions of lesbian and gay sexuality. In the work depicting herself, she is shown as both sexual and maternal, and as the art critic Prathap Nair says, this works to unsettle one's understanding of the gender binary. Similarly, documenta said her "dissident transgender body" allowed her to become "a living political sculpture, a sculptural manifesto". She explained in 1991 that the purpose of using armless statues, especially the Venus de Milo, was to "show the beauty of a mutilated body ... despite not having arms".

In 1992, after making a series of connections in the artistic scene of Barcelona and joining the Disabled Artists Network, she portrayed the mascot Petra at that year's paralympic games held in the city. Her performances—where she handled artistic equipment between her toes—were displayed in cities throughout the world, such as in New York. She did not achieve widespread recognition during her life.

== Death and legacy ==
Diagnosed with HIV in 1985, Böttner died of AIDS-related complications in Munich on 13 January 1994 at age 34.

The Chilean writers Roberto Bolaño and Pedro Lemebel wrote about Böttner in their novels Estrella Distante (1996) and Loco Afán (1996), respectively. Both of these writers used her life to advance a political theory of Chilean artistry. For her early life, Bolaño indicated that while still in Chile, she held secret street performances to save money to leave for Germany, even though she had left with her parents at 14; for her adult life, he said that she attempted to commit suicide, even though such an attempt never took place. According to Latin American studies scholar Carl Fischer, Bolaño's writing focused more on "what she failed at and hid" than "what she revealed", and he used her to demonstrate the types of people he thought were excluded from the Chilean literary canon. For Lemebel, Böttner served as one of his crónicas (chronicles) of LGBT life in the dictatorship of Augusto Pinochet, able to resist heterosexism and militarism through her "unfolding" of gender expectations.

She was a central character in scenes of Frank Garvey's film Wall of Ashes (2009), where she easily cleaned and refilled a pot using her feet. According to Fischer, Böttner saw carrying out normal actions (such as cleaning dishes) as her principal art form, since ones perception of her disability forced her to become a kind of exhibitionist in doing everyday tasks. She wished to "open people's eyes and show them how stupid it is to hide behind a bourgeois façade" through her life. In Michael Stahlberg's documentary Lorenza (1991), she orders cheese from a clerk, only for the camera to cut out when she is due to take them. For Fischer, this represents Böttner's artistic milieu: She exhibits "quotidian" actions, while also leaving some questions entirely unresolved.

In 2016, documenta in Kassel, Germany, began a public showing of her art. From 2018 onward, Preciado held a series of events showcasing Böttner's work in locations such as La Virreina Centre de la Imatge in Barcelona and the Württembergischer Kunstverein in Stuttgart. The exhibitions of documenta and Preciado marked the first time much of her work had been publicly seen in decades. While she did not receive widespread recognition for her work during her life, in 2024, journalist Cassidy George describes her as increasingly "recognized as a significant contribution to the art-historical canon, in part for its radical representation of atypical bodies".
