= Charles B. Tripp =

Sideshow performer

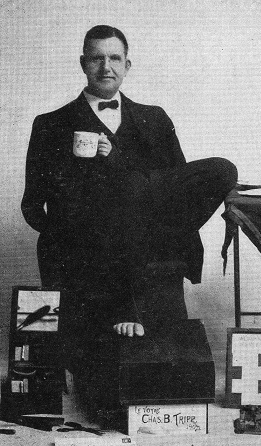
- Tripp photographed in 1907
- Born: 1855; Woodstock, Ontario, Canada
- Died: 1930 (aged 74–75); Salisbury, North Carolina, US
- Burial place: Olney, Illinois, US

Charles B. Tripp (1855–1930) was an artist and sideshow performer.

A native of Woodstock, Ontario, Tripp was born without arms, but learned to use his legs and feet to perform everyday tasks.

== Career ==
As a teenager in Woodstock, Ontario, Tripp supported his mother and sister by working as a carpenter and calligrapher despite having been born without arms. In 1872, at about age 17, he travelled to New York City to meet showman P. T. Barnum, who quickly hired him to perform with Barnum's Great Traveling World's Fair.

Tripp spent the next 23 years performing for Barnum and later James Anthony Bailey. He then toured with the Ringling Brothers for another 12 years, giving him a circus career that spanned more than 35 years.

Throughout his career, Tripp cultivated the appearance of a refined gentleman while demonstrating the dexterity of his feet. Before live audiences, he practiced calligraphy and carpentry, cut intricate paper designs, shaved himself, took photographs, and painted portraits. He also supplemented his income by signing promotional photographs with his feet.

During the height of his career, Tripp frequently appeared in publicity photographs with fellow sideshow performer Eli Bowen, who was known as the "Legless Wonder". The pair often posed on a tandem bicycle, with Tripp pedalling and Bowen steering, an arrangement that highlighted how each man adapted to his disability.

== Later life and death ==
By the 1910s, Tripp was no longer attracting the large audiences he had during his years with the major circuses, so he joined the traveling carnival circuit. His wife, Mae, travelled with him and sold tickets for the midway attractions.

Tripp spent the last several winters of his life in Salisbury, North Carolina, where he died 26 Jan 1930 (aged 74).

Contemporary sources disagree about the cause of his death, attributing it either to pneumonia or asthma.
