= William Marshall Craig =

English painter

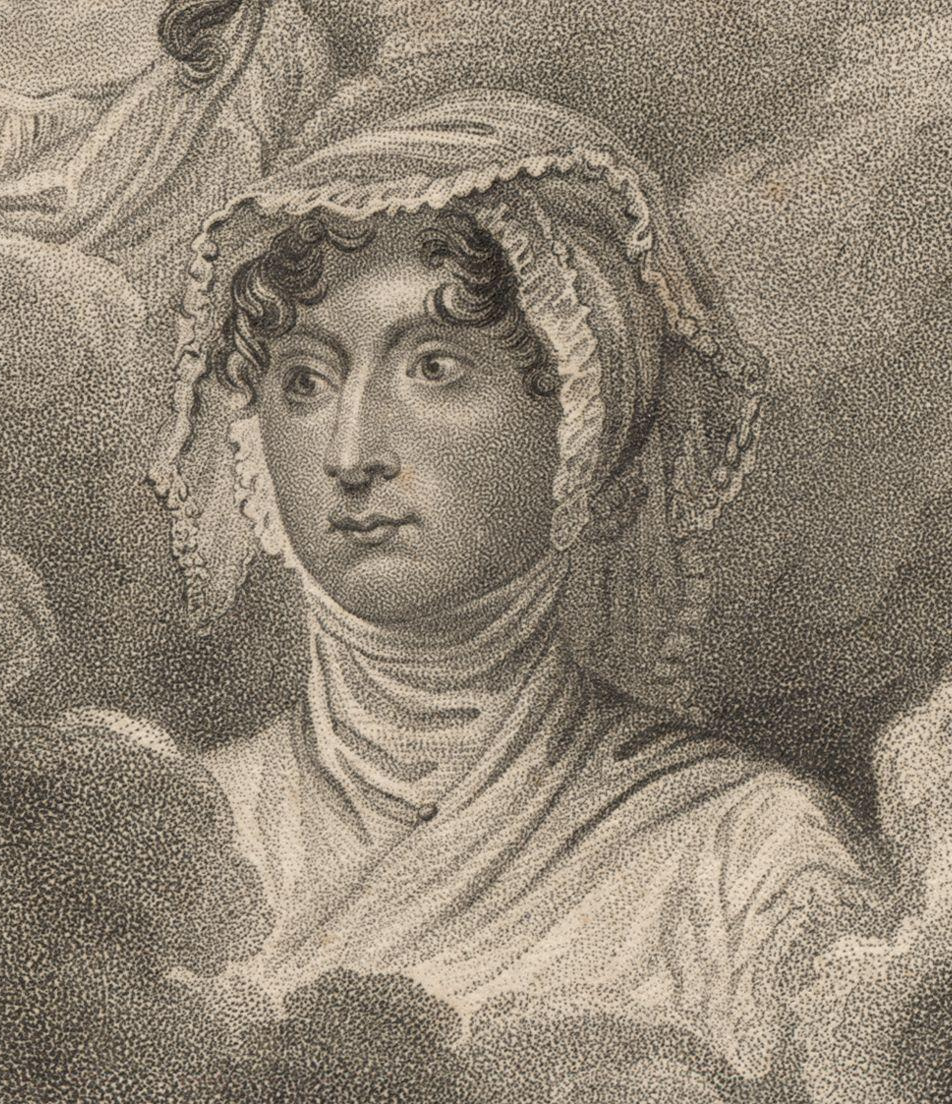
Princess Amelia, from Apotheosis of the Princes Octavius & Alfred, and of the Princess Amelia.

William Marshall Craig (died 1827) was an English painter who exhibited at times at the Royal Academy, from 1788 until 1827.

Craig first lived at Manchester, but settled in London about 1791. He was painter in water-colours to the Queen, and miniature painter to the Duke and Duchess of York. He also excelled as a draughtsman on wood, and as a book illustrator, and he published in 1821 'Lectures on Drawing, Painting, and Engraving.' He is said to have been a nephew of Thomson, the poet. 'The Wounded Soldier' by him is in the Water-Colour Gallery at the South Kensington Museum.

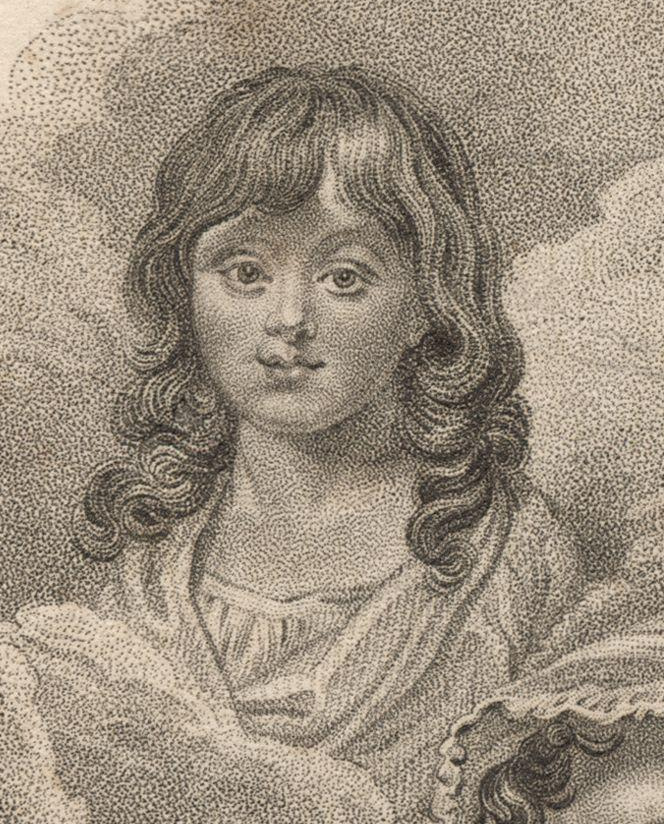
Prince Octavius

One of his pupils was the mouth-painter Sarah Biffen (1784–1850).
