= André Soubiran =

French physician and novelist

André Soubiran (29 July 1910 – 29 July 1999) was a French physician and novelist.

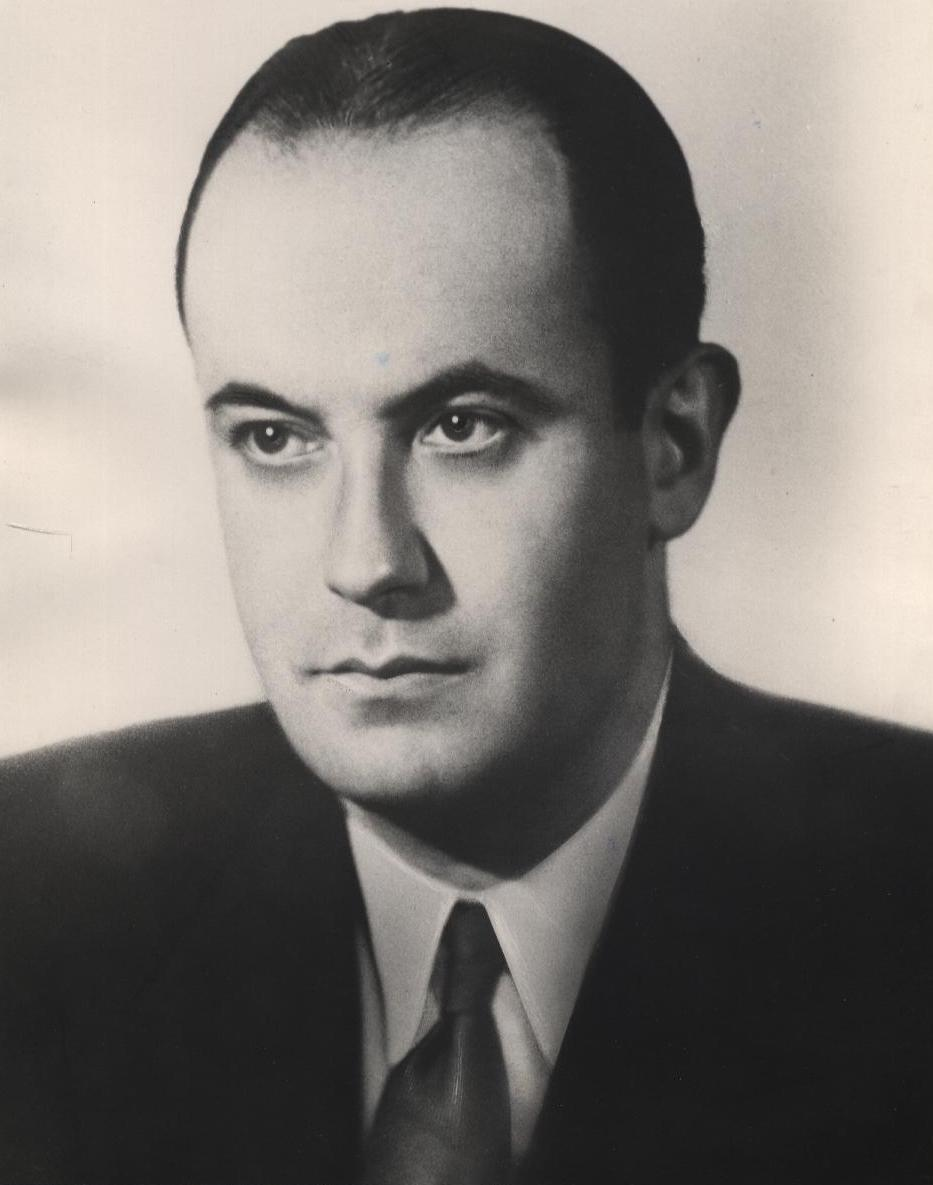
Portrait of André Soubiran, French Doctor and Writer.

Soubiran studied medicine in Toulouse and later in Paris, obtaining his doctorate in 1935. At the beginning of World War II, he took part in the Battle of France, an experience he recounted in J'étais médecin avec les chars ("I was a doctor with the tanks") which earned him the Prix Renaudot in 1943.

Soubiran's literary series Les hommes en blanc ("The men in white"), initially published from 1947 to 1958, was a commercial success, with the first two books selling more than 1.5 million copies. It was translated in English in 3 volumes: The Doctors, The Healing Oath and Good-bye, Doctor Roch, and was adapted into a film in 1955 (Men in White, directed by Ralph Habib).

Books by Soubiran translated in English also include L'île aux fous (Bedlam, 1955) and Journal d'une femme en blanc (Diary of a Woman in White, 1964). The latter, which tackled the subject of then-illegal abortion, was adapted for the big screen in 1965 (A Woman in White, directed by Claude Autant-Lara).

Soubiran wrote the preface to Denise Legrix's autobiography entitled Née comme ça.
