= Federal College of Education (Technical), Bichi =

Federal government higher education institution in Bichi, Kano State, Nigeria

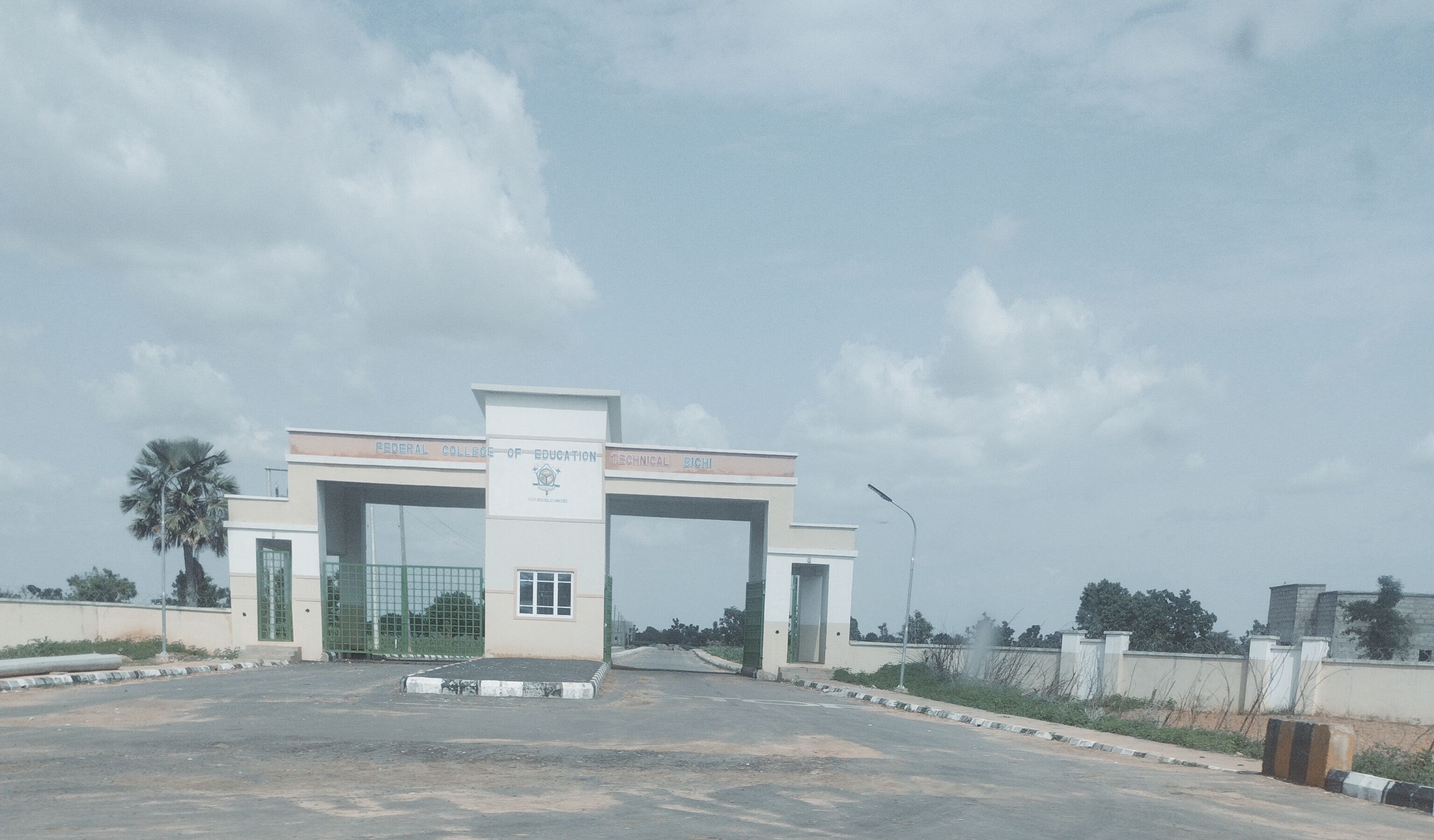
- Type: Public
- Established: 1986
- Affiliations: Abubakar Tafawa Balewa University
- Provost: Bashir Muhammad Fagge
- Location: Bichi, Kano State, Nigeria; 12.2268°N 8.2154°E

The Federal College of Education (Technical), Bichi is a federal government higher education institution located in Bichi, Kano State, Nigeria. It is affiliated to Abubakar Tafawa Balewa University for its degree programmes. The current Provost is Bashir Muhammad Fagge.

== History ==
The Federal College of Education (Technical), Bichi was established in 1986.

== College Library ==
The library has information resources both online databases, journals and books that serve the school, students and lecturers.

== Courses ==
The institution offers the following courses;

- Early Childhood Care Education
- History Education
- Christian Religious Studies
- Special Education
- Technical Education
- Computer Education
- Arabic
- Adult and Non-Formal Education
- Chemistry Education
- Agricultural Science
- Biology Education
- Electrical/Electronics Education
- Primary Education Studies
- Home Economics
- Building Technology Education
- Metalwork Technology Education
- Education and Integrated Science
- French
- Physical And Health Education
- Education and Mathematics
- Fine And Applied Arts
- Business Education

== Affiliation ==
The institution is affiliated to Abubakar Tafawa Balewa University and offers programmes leading to Bachelor of Education, (B.Ed.) in;

- Electrical/Electronics Education
- Building Technology Education
- Metal Work Technology Education
