= National Bal Shree Honour =

- Civilian award for contributions by children between the ages of 9 and 16
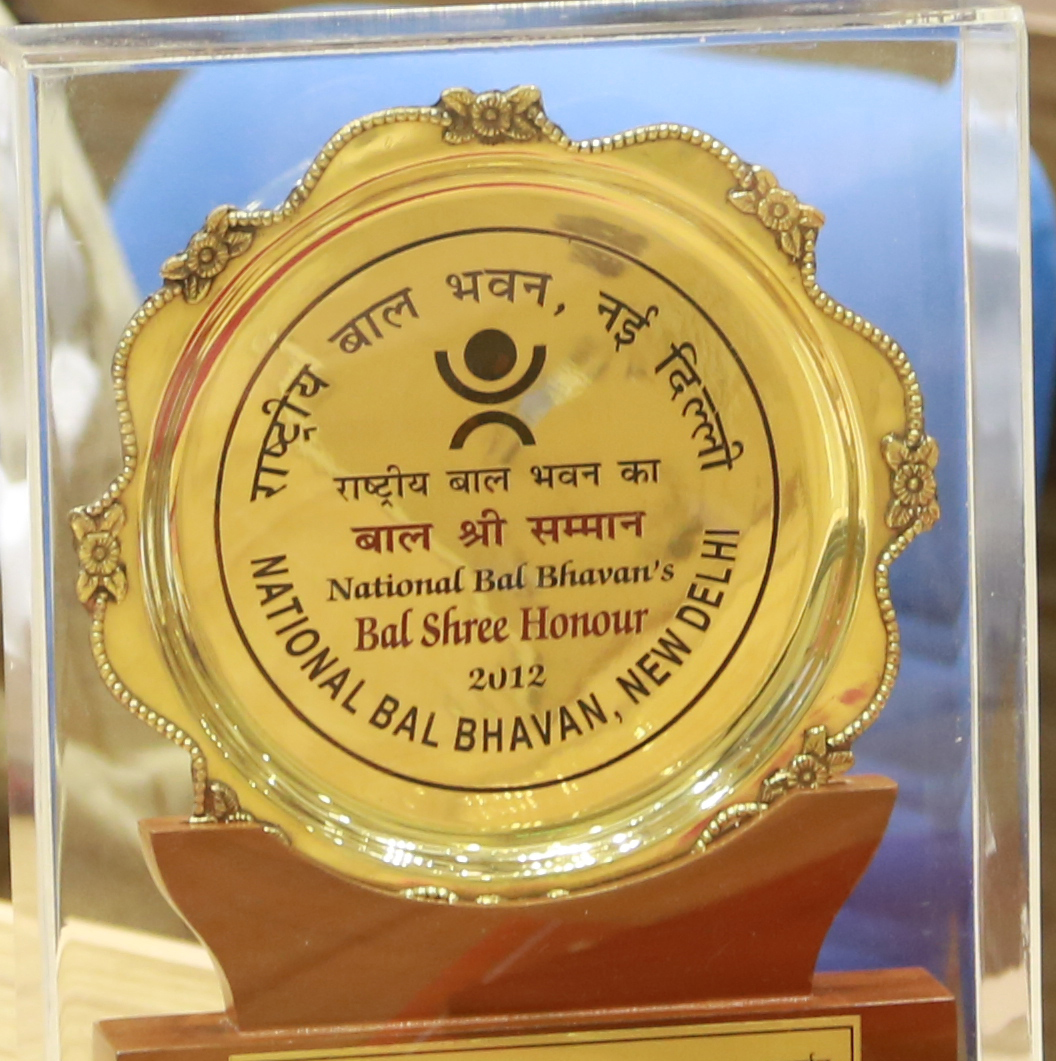
- National bal shree honour plaque
- Type: Civilian award
- Sponsored by: National Bal Bhawan
- Venue: Durbar Hall, Vigyan Bhavan
- Country: India
- Presented by: Government of India
- Rewards: Plaque Award, Citation or a Certificate Award, Cash Prize of Rs. 15,000 (Kisan Vikas Patra), Literature Set (Consisting of Books/CDs)
- First award: 1995
- Final award: 2015 (for the year 2011 & 2013)

The National Bal Shree Honour (Hindi: राष्ट्रीय बाल श्री सम्मान) is awarded to creative children in the age group of 9–16 years. National Bal Shree Honour is constituted by National Bal Bhawan, an autonomous body of Ministry of Human Resource Development (India). The Honour includes a plaque, a certificate, educational resources and a cash prize. National Bal Shree Honour is usually awarded by the Minister of Human Resource Development at Vigyan Bhavan in New Delhi.

National Bal Shree Honour is one of the three highest national honours for children of India, ranking 2nd, after the Pradhan Mantri Rashtriya Bal Puruskar (previously National Child Award for Exceptional Achievement)

== Etymology ==
In Hindi the word 'bal' means a child and 'Shree' denotes fame and also used as an aura of glory. Shree is also a name for Lakshmi, the goddess of wealth and knowledge.

== History ==
Bal Shree Scheme was conceived in 1993. After working out its modalities, it was finally launched in 1995.

It was last in the year 2020 for the year 2015 and has since been discontinued.

== Areas of creative expression ==
The Bal Shree Honour is awarded to creative children in the age group of 9–16 years in the following areas of expression.

- Creative Performance
- Creative Art
- Creative Painting
- Creative Scientific Innovation
- Creative Writing

== Mode of Selection ==
The selection of creative children in four areas is done at three levels:

1. Local Level (by respective Bal Bhavans)
2. Zonal Level (by respective State Bal Bhavan)
3. National Level (At National Bal Bhavan)

=== Local Level ===
At this level National Bal Bhavan and all affiliated State Bal Bhavans undertake preliminary screening for selecting candidates for National level camp. A 2- days camp for member children is organized at State Bal Bhavans. After local selection 8 children (2 in each stream) are nominated by the affiliated Bal Bhavans for their respective Zonal level camps. An additional nomination is sent in case the nominee is a child of special needs or from tribal areas.

=== Zonal Level ===
In the zonal level, the country has been divided into different zones – North, East, West, Central, and South. As there are large number of Bal Bhavans in the southern region, South Zone has further been divided into two zones – South-I and South-II Zones. Every year different Zonal Centers are identified for organizing zonal selection camps. As there are certain states where there are no Bal Bhavans, representation of these states are ensured through the Chief Secretaries of these states. Children selected at the local levels participate in these 3-days zonal level camps where the second round of selections is made by local experts, specialists from the Zone and National Bal Bhavan. The local resource persons are thoroughly briefed by the National Bal Bhavan before the start of the camps.

=== National Level ===
This is the final level where the qualifying students from different States are provided a common platform to prove their creativity in their respective fields at the 4-days National Level Camp held at National Bal Bhavan. New Delhi. A panel of experts and resource persons drawn from the various streams is identified to administer the tests. In the National Level camp the psychological tests are also conducted by experts. These include verbal tests and tests on creativity. On the basis of these tests and other tools, the children are finally selected.

== Criteria of Selection ==
While selecting children, the process and product are assessed on the basis of:

- Originality
- Innovative approach
- Fluency
- Flexibility
- Divergent thinking
- Elaboration of ideas
- Creative process culminating into meaningful product
- Effective functioning in the group
- Analytical and critical approach

== Tools used for selection of children ==
There are two types of tools used for selection of children

- Activity related tools
- Psychological tests

=== Activity Related Tools ===
For identifying the creative talents of children, an exhaustive list of activities is planned in four identified areas. The tools are specific to the activity as well as according to the different age groups. These tools are continuously being evolved and every time new and innovative tools are administered for identifying creativity of children.

=== Psychological Test ===
Standardized Psychological tests on creativity are administered.

== Norms of National Bal Shree Honour Scheme ==
- The participant must not be below 9 years nor above 16 years of age as on 1 April of the year of participation.
- The three age groups would be 9 to 11 years, 11 to 14 years and 14 to 16 years. The age group will be decided on the basis of age as on 1 April of the year of participation.
- As has been regularly intimated to State Bal Bhavans since 2001, a child can participate in Bal Shree selection process a maximum of 2 times, be it at any level (Local, Zonal or National), that too provided the stream or age group is different at the time of participation for the second time. A Bal Shree Awardee is debarred from participating again in the Bal Shree selection process.

=== Bal Shree Honour ===
- Plaque Award
- Citation or a Certificate Award
- Cash Prize of Rs. 15,000 (Kisan Vikas Patra)
- Literature Set (Consisting of Books/CDs)

=== Eligibility ===
Age - 10 to 16 Years (As on 1 April 2015) Age groups

- 10 to 12 Years Age Groups
- 12 to 14 Years Age Groups
- 14 to 16 Years Age Groups

Number of attempts - Each child can participate maximum two times and the second attempt is permitted only in another age group. Attempt made at ‘State Level’ will be treated as attempt for Bal Shree Selection.
