= Denise Legrix =

French painter and writer (1910–2010)

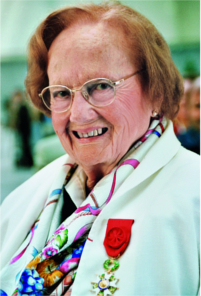
Denise-Legrix

Denise Legrix (1910–2010) was a French painter and author. Born with dysmelia, without full arms or legs, she painted using a brush in her mouth. She was a member of the Association of Mouth and Foot Painting Artists (AMFPA). She founded the Association d'entraide des enfants et adultes dysméliques (Association for Mutual Support of Children and Adults with Dysmelia) (ANEEAD). She published autobiographical volumes that have been translated into different languages.

== Life and career ==
Denise Marie Louise Legrix was born on May 16, 1910, in the hamlet of Vauvrecy, in the commune of Cahagnes in the Calvados department of Normandy, France. She was born with dysmelia, with malformations of her arms and legs. From early on, with the support of her family, she found ways of getting around her physical limitations and gaining autonomy. From childhood she enjoyed drawing and painting and later became a professional painter. In 1965, she became one of the first members of the Association of Mouth and Foot Painting Artists. Legrix published a three-volume autobiography called"Née comme ça", in English Born Like that, for which she won the Albert Schweitzer prize in 1960. The preface was written by Dr André Soubiran. The English translation came out in 1962 with Souvenir Press. In 1994, Legrix also published Ma joie de vivre: Croire, Sourire, Lutter, called in English My Joy of Living: Believe, Smile, Fight. In 1970, Legrix founded l'Association d'Entraide des Enfants et Adultes Dysméliques (ANEEAD), the Association for Mutual Support of Children and Adults with Dysmelia She supported families with both physical and mental handicaps. She organised, with Radio Luxembourg, a fundraising campaign called Hope. The funds raised were given to the Ministry of Health to put towards the establishment of the National Institute of Physical Medicine and Rehabilitation (INR), within the Saint-Maurice National Hospital. The institute is dedicated to the treatment of children with congenital or acquired motor and neurological disabilities. Legrix was often asked to speak at conferences to defend the right of those with handicaps to live a full life. Legrix died on August 25, 2010, in Lisieux, aged 100 years.

== Awards ==
In 1960, Legrix was awarded The Albert Schweitzer Prize for her first book. In 1963, she gained the Lane Bryant Dedication Award and in 1964, The French Courage Award. In 1968 she was made Officer of the National Order of Merit. This was upgraded to Officer of the Legion of Honour in 2003.

== Legacy ==
In 1997, the Association for Mutual Support of Children and Adults with Dysmelia (ANEEAD), which Legrix founded, was renamed the Denise Legrix Association. When the National Institute of Rehabilitation (INR) was founded on October 2, 1967, a plaque with Legrix's name was unveiled in Pavilion A of the Saint-Maurice Hospitals (Val-de-Marne).
