= Association of Mouth and Foot Painting Artists of the World =

For-profit internantional organization

The Association of Mouth and Foot Painting Artists of the World (AMFPA) is a for-profit international organization facilitating the sale of artwork produced by mouth and foot painting artists associated with the organization. None of the artists have proper use of their hands as a pre-condition to joining the association. It represents around 820 artists located in 76 countries, of whom 143 (as of 2016) are full members, and receive a monthly fee from the organization from the date of their admission until their death. The other artists are students, who receive a monthly scholarship until such time as they are promoted.

The main product of the organization is Christmas cards designed by the member artists. These cards are sold every year in the months leading up to Christmas via direct mailing in 48 countries around the world. Other products include postcards, art prints, jigsaw puzzles, and calendars.

The parent company in Liechtenstein acquires the reproduction rights of a given painting and distributes it internationally. The original works are also sold at exhibitions held throughout the world. Works produced by the members have been shown in the United Nations Office at Geneva and at the European Council in Strasbourg.

== History ==
AMFPA was founded in 1957 as the Vereinigung der Mund- und Fussmalenden Künstler in aller Welt, e. V. (VDMFK), in Liechtenstein. It was styled a "self-help" organization and had the scope to further the painting skills of any mouth or foot painter, to promote their artwork and to support them financially.

=== A. Erich Stegmann ===
The first president of the association, Arnulf Erich Stegmann, was a prominent figure in the development of mouth and foot painting. Born in 1912 in Darmstadt, Germany, Stegmann lost the use of both arms from polio at the age of two. Regardless, his artistic talents were soon recognized and supported by his teachers. He was proficient with a variety of brushes and styles, using only his mouth. He was educated at the School of Higher Education for Book Trade and Graphics in Nuremberg and studied with the artists Erwin von Kormöndy and Hans Gerstacker. He made a living selling his art cards and prints at marketplaces. After the Second World War he established his own publishing company with the name "Dennoch" ("Anyway").

In 1953/54 he organized the "Lodge of Mouth and Foot Painting Artists" as a type of artists' community. This developed into the international "Association of Mouth and Foot Painting Artists", with Stegmann elected president for life.

== Objectives ==
The association's stated objectives are:

- Find as many mouth and foot painting artists as possible.
- Safeguard and promote the interests of the mouth and foot painting artists, improve their working and living conditions, promote and improve their artistic abilities and skills, in particular, by promoting the commercial use of their work.
- Conclude and negotiate contracts with publishers in countries all over the world.
- Grant scholarships to promote the development of mouth and foot painting artists.
- Collect and make available to its members or Student Members the literature and medical or other aids owned by the Association or by others.
- Organise exhibitions by mouth and foot painting artists.
- Collect, catalogue, and administer the works created by the members.

== Organization ==
The association is run as a "democratic co-operative". Any mouth and foot painter of unimpeachable reputation living anywhere in the world can become a member of the association, provided they are 18 years of age and their works are considered artistic by the Jury who then recommends them for membership to the Managing Board.

The management procedures are governed by the statutes, which require that a Delegates Convention or General Assembly of all members must be held at least once every three years.

For electoral purposes, the Association divides the world into four regions: Europe, Africa and the Middle East; the Americas; the Far East; Australasia and Oceania. Each region deputes at least one delegate for every five members.

The managing board members and the president are elected by the members of the association. With the exception of the legal representative, every managing board member has to be a recognized mouth or foot painter.

== Member organizations ==
=== United Kingdom ===
The Mouth and Foot Painting Artists (MFPA) is the British organization for mouth and foot painters, and is a member organization of AMFPA. It was established in 1973 following legislation which required that disabled people be in charge of the business activities of an organization representing them.

== International exhibitions ==
During the last 50 years paintings and artworks of mouth- and footpainters have been shown in numerous museums and town halls around the world. International exhibitions were held, for instance, in the following venues:

- Town Hall of Madrid (Spain), March 1981
- UNO Headquarters in Geneva (Switzerland), September 1981
- Guildhall Art Gallery in London (UK) in September 1982
- Oslo Concert Hall (Norway), November 1991
- Council of Europe in Strasbourg (France), November 1996
- Palace of Nations in Geneva (Switzerland), August 1998
- Museum of Contemporary Art in Sydney (Australia), March 2000
- Woodruff Arts Center in Atlanta (USA), May 2003
- China Art Museum in Shanghai (PRC), April 2005
- Albertina Museum in Vienna (Austria), April 2007
- Chiang Kai-Shek Memorial Hall in Taipei (ROC- Taiwan), October 2012
- Hofburg in Vienna (Austria), July 2013
- Zappeion in Athens (Greece), October 2014
- Town Hall of Copenhagen (Denmark), October 2015
- Museu Maritim in Barcelona (Spain), April 2017
- Museu do Amanhã (Brazil), September 2018

== Supporters of AMFPA artists ==
AMFPA has many customers and supporters from around the world who appreciate and understand the difficult lives and inspiring works of the artists. Among those prominent figures to have spoken in favour of, met or celebrated lives of AMFPA artists are the Pope, Pierce Brosnan, Prince Harry, Queen Sofía of Spain, Heinz Fischer, former president of Austria; Ma Ying-Jeou, former president of Taiwan; Bertel Haarder, Danish Minister for culture and church; Mauricio Macri, former president of Argentina; Arnold Schwarzenegger 38th Governor of California; Salman Kahn, Amitabh Bachchan, Narendra Modi, Prime Minister of India; David Dimbleby, Seal, Keith Chesney, King Charles III, Al Gore 45th Vice President of the United States; Morgan Freeman; (the late) Sir Terry Wogan KBE, Frederick Forsyth CBE, Kathy Lee Gifford, Jonny Wilkinson MBE, Anton Du Beke, Susan Boyle, David Coulthard MBE, Sir Bradley Wiggins, Sir Geoffrey Boycott, Alesha Dixon, KT Tunstall, Aled Jones, Bennett Gartside, Sean Lock, Rula Lenska, Katie Couric, Sophie, Duchess of Edinburgh, Sir Harold Evans, Boris Johnson, Lord Hague, David Shepherd OBE, Lorraine Kelly, Rafael Nadal, Ram Nath Kovind, former President of India; William, Prince of Wales, Pau Gasol, Prokopis Pavlopoulos, former President of Greece

== Controversies ==
Then years ago AMFPA has been the subject of several exposés in German, French, Swiss, Swedish, Norwegian, Polish, British, Canadian and Danish media, suggesting unethical behaviour within the organization. The coverage has spurred criticism from charity, consumer and disability organizations. The criticism included:

- That AMFPA effectively poses as a charity organization although it is purely a commercial venture, in effect conning charitable people out of money.
- That only a fraction of the surplus is paid out to the disabled artists, since only 94 (2008) of them are fully employed by the company, which in turn allegedly turns a worldwide profit in the hundreds of millions US$. The precise worldwide profit is confidential but these alleged figures are officially disputed by AMFPA as greatly exaggerated and without proper merit.
- That high salaries, favourable loans and property lease contracts are given to AMFPAs long-time, now former, legal adviser Herbert Batliner.
- That funds are being diverted to unknown parties via a network of "mailbox" companies.
- The use of high pressure sales tactics by sending its main sales item, Christmas card packages to consumers via unsolicited direct mail with an option to pay afterwards.
- The secrecy maintained by the company.

No claims have been made suggesting any illegal activity by AMFPA. The criticism has been centred on what is perceived as bad ethics.

=== AMFPA's response to criticism ===
The AMFPA has in some news reports and court hearings responded to some of the claims, stating that AMFPA has never intentionally presented itself as a charitable organization, but instead has explicitly pointed its commercial nature out to consumers. AMFPA has also stated that 80% of the worldwide profits are distributed among the artists. AMFPA declined to present financial records to support this claim.

AMFPA stated that it never introduced pressure sales tactics but made use of direct mailing many years before competitors and charity organisations introduced similar methods. AMFPA sees itself as a victim of an unfair and tendentious journalistic coverage lacking of true facts and suspecting bad ethics.

=== Litigation ===
In June 2007 the company sued the Danish Broadcasting Corporation and Danish daily Ekstra Bladet for libel, following negative coverage during December 2005. On 10 October 2008, the High Court of Eastern Denmark ruled in favor of the accused journalists, stating that there was sufficient factual basis for statements like: "Behind the scenes we found a well-oiled money making machine with economic puppeteers, who are scraping in money with arms and legs"; "People think they are supporting a charity, but in reality we are looking at a money making machine"; and "...only a measly 3% is going to the mouth and foot painting artists". AMFPA did not appeal the decision.

== Member artists ==
- Alison Lapper
- Edward Rainey
- Dolors Vázquez Aznar
- Brom Wikstrom
- Denise Legrix
